The Lepidoptera of North Macedonia consist of both the butterflies and moths recorded from North Macedonia.

Butterflies

Hesperiidae
Carcharodus alceae (Esper, 1780)
Carcharodus floccifera (Zeller, 1847)
Carcharodus lavatherae (Esper, 1783)
Carcharodus orientalis Reverdin, 1913
Erynnis marloyi (Boisduval, 1834)
Erynnis tages (Linnaeus, 1758)
Gegenes nostrodamus (Fabricius, 1793)
Hesperia comma (Linnaeus, 1758)
Muschampia cribrellum (Eversmann, 1841)
Muschampia proto (Ochsenheimer, 1808)
Muschampia tessellum (Hübner, 1803)
Ochlodes sylvanus (Esper, 1777)
Pyrgus alveus (Hübner, 1803)
Pyrgus andromedae (Wallengren, 1853)
Pyrgus armoricanus (Oberthur, 1910)
Pyrgus carthami (Hübner, 1813)
Pyrgus cinarae (Rambur, 1839)
Pyrgus malvae (Linnaeus, 1758)
Pyrgus serratulae (Rambur, 1839)
Pyrgus sidae (Esper, 1784)
Spialia orbifer (Hübner, 1823)
Spialia phlomidis (Herrich-Schäffer, 1845)
Thymelicus acteon (Rottemburg, 1775)
Thymelicus lineola (Ochsenheimer, 1808)
Thymelicus sylvestris (Poda, 1761)

Lycaenidae
Agriades dardanus (Freyer, 1845)
Agriades optilete (Knoch, 1781)
Aricia agestis (Denis & Schiffermüller, 1775)
Aricia anteros (Freyer, 1838)
Aricia artaxerxes (Fabricius, 1793)
Callophrys rubi (Linnaeus, 1758)
Celastrina argiolus (Linnaeus, 1758)
Cupido minimus (Fuessly, 1775)
Cupido osiris (Meigen, 1829)
Cupido alcetas (Hoffmannsegg, 1804)
Cupido argiades (Pallas, 1771)
Cupido decolorata (Staudinger, 1886)
Cyaniris semiargus (Rottemburg, 1775)
Eumedonia eumedon (Esper, 1780)
Favonius quercus (Linnaeus, 1758)
Glaucopsyche alexis (Poda, 1761)
Iolana iolas (Ochsenheimer, 1816)
Kretania sephirus (Frivaldszky, 1835)
Lampides boeticus (Linnaeus, 1767)
Leptotes pirithous (Linnaeus, 1767)
Lycaena alciphron (Rottemburg, 1775)
Lycaena candens (Herrich-Schäffer, 1844)
Lycaena dispar (Haworth, 1802)
Lycaena ottomanus (Lefebvre, 1830)
Lycaena phlaeas (Linnaeus, 1761)
Lycaena thersamon (Esper, 1784)
Lycaena thetis Klug, 1834
Lycaena tityrus (Poda, 1761)
Lycaena virgaureae (Linnaeus, 1758)
Lysandra bellargus (Rottemburg, 1775)
Lysandra coridon (Poda, 1761)
Phengaris alcon (Denis & Schiffermüller, 1775)
Phengaris arion (Linnaeus, 1758)
Plebejus argus (Linnaeus, 1758)
Plebejus argyrognomon (Bergstrasser, 1779)
Plebejus idas (Linnaeus, 1761)
Polyommatus admetus (Esper, 1783)
Polyommatus damon (Denis & Schiffermüller, 1775)
Polyommatus ripartii (Freyer, 1830)
Polyommatus daphnis (Denis & Schiffermüller, 1775)
Polyommatus amandus (Schneider, 1792)
Polyommatus dorylas (Denis & Schiffermüller, 1775)
Polyommatus eros (Ochsenheimer, 1808)
Polyommatus escheri (Hübner, 1823)
Polyommatus icarus (Rottemburg, 1775)
Polyommatus thersites (Cantener, 1835)
Pseudophilotes bavius (Eversmann, 1832)
Pseudophilotes vicrama (Moore, 1865)
Satyrium acaciae (Fabricius, 1787)
Satyrium ilicis (Esper, 1779)
Satyrium pruni (Linnaeus, 1758)
Satyrium spini (Denis & Schiffermüller, 1775)
Satyrium w-album (Knoch, 1782)
Scolitantides orion (Pallas, 1771)
Tarucus balkanica (Freyer, 1844)
Thecla betulae (Linnaeus, 1758)

Nymphalidae
Aglais io (Linnaeus, 1758)
Aglais urticae (Linnaeus, 1758)
Apatura ilia (Denis & Schiffermüller, 1775)
Apatura iris (Linnaeus, 1758)
Apatura metis Freyer, 1829
Aphantopus hyperantus (Linnaeus, 1758)
Arethusana arethusa (Denis & Schiffermüller, 1775)
Argynnis paphia (Linnaeus, 1758)
Argynnis pandora (Denis & Schiffermüller, 1775)
Boloria graeca (Staudinger, 1870)
Boloria pales (Denis & Schiffermüller, 1775)
Boloria dia (Linnaeus, 1767)
Boloria euphrosyne (Linnaeus, 1758)
Brenthis daphne (Bergstrasser, 1780)
Brenthis hecate (Denis & Schiffermüller, 1775)
Brenthis ino (Rottemburg, 1775)
Brintesia circe (Fabricius, 1775)
Chazara briseis (Linnaeus, 1764)
Coenonympha arcania (Linnaeus, 1761)
Coenonympha glycerion (Borkhausen, 1788)
Coenonympha leander (Esper, 1784)
Coenonympha pamphilus (Linnaeus, 1758)
Coenonympha rhodopensis Elwes, 1900
Erebia aethiops (Esper, 1777)
Erebia alberganus (de Prunner, 1798)
Erebia cassioides (Reiner & Hochenwarth, 1792)
Erebia epiphron (Knoch, 1783)
Erebia euryale (Esper, 1805)
Erebia gorge (Hübner, 1804)
Erebia ligea (Linnaeus, 1758)
Erebia medusa (Denis & Schiffermüller, 1775)
Erebia melas (Herbst, 1796)
Erebia oeme (Hübner, 1804)
Erebia ottomana Herrich-Schäffer, 1847
Erebia pandrose (Borkhausen, 1788)
Erebia pronoe (Esper, 1780)
Erebia rhodopensis Nicholl, 1900
Euphydryas aurinia (Rottemburg, 1775)
Euphydryas maturna (Linnaeus, 1758)
Fabriciana adippe (Denis & Schiffermüller, 1775)
Fabriciana niobe (Linnaeus, 1758)
Hipparchia fagi (Scopoli, 1763)
Hipparchia syriaca (Staudinger, 1871)
Hipparchia fatua Freyer, 1844
Hipparchia statilinus (Hufnagel, 1766)
Hipparchia semele (Linnaeus, 1758)
Hipparchia senthes (Fruhstorfer, 1908)
Hipparchia volgensis (Mazochin-Porshnjakov, 1952)
Hyponephele lupinus (O. Costa, 1836)
Hyponephele lycaon (Rottemburg, 1775)
Issoria lathonia (Linnaeus, 1758)
Kirinia climene (Esper, 1783)
Kirinia roxelana (Cramer, 1777)
Lasiommata maera (Linnaeus, 1758)
Lasiommata megera (Linnaeus, 1767)
Lasiommata petropolitana (Fabricius, 1787)
Libythea celtis (Laicharting, 1782)
Limenitis camilla (Linnaeus, 1764)
Limenitis populi (Linnaeus, 1758)
Limenitis reducta Staudinger, 1901
Maniola jurtina (Linnaeus, 1758)
Melanargia galathea (Linnaeus, 1758)
Melanargia larissa (Geyer, 1828)
Melanargia russiae (Esper, 1783)
Melitaea arduinna (Esper, 1783)
Melitaea athalia (Rottemburg, 1775)
Melitaea cinxia (Linnaeus, 1758)
Melitaea diamina (Lang, 1789)
Melitaea didyma (Esper, 1778)
Melitaea phoebe (Denis & Schiffermüller, 1775)
Melitaea trivia (Denis & Schiffermüller, 1775)
Minois dryas (Scopoli, 1763)
Neptis rivularis (Scopoli, 1763)
Neptis sappho (Pallas, 1771)
Nymphalis antiopa (Linnaeus, 1758)
Nymphalis polychloros (Linnaeus, 1758)
Nymphalis xanthomelas (Esper, 1781)
Pararge aegeria (Linnaeus, 1758)
Polygonia c-album (Linnaeus, 1758)
Polygonia egea (Cramer, 1775)
Pseudochazara anthelea (Hübner, 1824)
Pseudochazara cingovskii Gross, 1973
Pseudochazara geyeri (Herrich-Schäffer, 1846)
Pseudochazara graeca (Staudinger, 1870)
Pyronia cecilia (Vallantin, 1894)
Pyronia tithonus (Linnaeus, 1767)
Satyrus ferula (Fabricius, 1793)
Speyeria aglaja (Linnaeus, 1758)
Vanessa atalanta (Linnaeus, 1758)
Vanessa cardui (Linnaeus, 1758)

Papilionidae
Iphiclides podalirius (Linnaeus, 1758)
Papilio alexanor Esper, 1800
Papilio machaon Linnaeus, 1758
Parnassius apollo (Linnaeus, 1758)
Parnassius mnemosyne (Linnaeus, 1758)
Zerynthia cerisy (Godart, 1824)
Zerynthia polyxena (Denis & Schiffermüller, 1775)

Pieridae
Anthocharis cardamines (Linnaeus, 1758)
Anthocharis damone Boisduval, 1836
Anthocharis gruneri Herrich-Schäffer, 1851
Aporia crataegi (Linnaeus, 1758)
Colias alfacariensis Ribbe, 1905
Colias caucasica Staudinger, 1871
Colias croceus (Fourcroy, 1785)
Colias erate (Esper, 1805)
Colias hyale (Linnaeus, 1758)
Euchloe penia (Freyer, 1851)
Euchloe ausonia (Hübner, 1804)
Gonepteryx farinosa (Zeller, 1847)
Gonepteryx rhamni (Linnaeus, 1758)
Leptidea duponcheli (Staudinger, 1871)
Leptidea sinapis (Linnaeus, 1758)
Pieris balcana Lorkovic, 1970
Pieris brassicae (Linnaeus, 1758)
Pieris ergane (Geyer, 1828)
Pieris krueperi Staudinger, 1860
Pieris mannii (Mayer, 1851)
Pieris napi (Linnaeus, 1758)
Pieris rapae (Linnaeus, 1758)
Pontia chloridice (Hübner, 1813)
Pontia edusa (Fabricius, 1777)

Riodinidae
Hamearis lucina (Linnaeus, 1758)

Moths

Adelidae
Adela australis (Heydenreich, 1851)
Adela croesella (Scopoli, 1763)
Adela homalella Staudinger, 1859
Adela reaumurella (Linnaeus, 1758)
Adela violella (Denis & Schiffermüller, 1775)
Cauchas fibulella (Denis & Schiffermüller, 1775)
Cauchas leucocerella (Scopoli, 1763)
Cauchas rufifrontella (Treitschke, 1833)
Cauchas rufimitrella (Scopoli, 1763)
Nematopogon robertella (Clerck, 1759)
Nematopogon schwarziellus Zeller, 1839
Nemophora dumerilella (Duponchel, 1839)
Nemophora fasciella (Fabricius, 1775)
Nemophora metallica (Poda, 1761)
Nemophora prodigellus (Zeller, 1853)
Nemophora raddaella (Hübner, 1793)

Alucitidae
Alucita bidentata Scholz & Jackh, 1994
Alucita cancellata (Meyrick, 1908)
Alucita cymatodactyla Zeller, 1852
Alucita desmodactyla Zeller, 1847
Alucita grammodactyla Zeller, 1841
Alucita huebneri Wallengren, 1859
Alucita major (Rebel, 1906)
Alucita palodactyla Zeller, 1847

Argyresthiidae
Argyresthia albistria (Haworth, 1828)
Argyresthia aurulentella Stainton, 1849
Argyresthia goedartella (Linnaeus, 1758)
Argyresthia kasyi Friese, 1963
Argyresthia pruniella (Clerck, 1759)
Argyresthia impura Staudinger, 1880

Autostichidae
Amselina cedestiella (Zeller, 1868)
Amselina kasyi (Gozmany, 1961)
Apatema mediopallidum Walsingham, 1900
Apatema sutteri Gozmany, 1997
Aprominta atricanella (Rebel, 1906)
Aprominta designatella (Herrich-Schäffer, 1855)
Dysspastus undecimpunctella (Mann, 1864)
Holcopogon bubulcellus (Staudinger, 1859)
Nukusa cinerella (Rebel, 1941)
Oegoconia deauratella (Herrich-Schäffer, 1854)
Oegoconia novimundi (Busck, 1915)
Pantacordis pantsa (Gozmany, 1963)

Bedelliidae
Bedellia somnulentella (Zeller, 1847)

Blastobasidae
Blastobasis phycidella (Zeller, 1839)
Hypatopa inunctella Zeller, 1839

Brachodidae
Brachodes nana (Treitschke, 1834)
Brachodes pumila (Ochsenheimer, 1808)
Brachodes tristis (Staudinger, 1879)

Brahmaeidae
Lemonia balcanica (Herrich-Schäffer, 1847)
Lemonia dumi (Linnaeus, 1761)
Lemonia taraxaci (Denis & Schiffermüller, 1775)

Bucculatricidae
Bucculatrix albedinella (Zeller, 1839)
Bucculatrix albella Stainton, 1867
Bucculatrix bechsteinella (Bechstein & Scharfenberg, 1805)
Bucculatrix benacicolella Hartig, 1937
Bucculatrix cantabricella Chretien, 1898
Bucculatrix cidarella (Zeller, 1839)
Bucculatrix demaryella (Duponchel, 1840)
Bucculatrix frangutella (Goeze, 1783)
Bucculatrix herbalbella Chretien, 1915
Bucculatrix infans Staudinger, 1880
Bucculatrix nigricomella (Zeller, 1839)
Bucculatrix pseudosylvella Rebel, 1941
Bucculatrix thoracella (Thunberg, 1794)
Bucculatrix ulmella Zeller, 1848
Bucculatrix ulmifoliae M. Hering, 1931
Bucculatrix zizyphella Chretien, 1907

Carposinidae
Carposina berberidella Herrich-Schäffer, 1854
Carposina scirrhosella Herrich-Schäffer, 1854

Chimabachidae
Diurnea fagella (Denis & Schiffermüller, 1775)

Choreutidae
Choreutis nemorana (Hübner, 1799)
Choreutis pariana (Clerck, 1759)
Prochoreutis myllerana (Fabricius, 1794)
Prochoreutis stellaris (Zeller, 1847)
Tebenna micalis (Mann, 1857)

Coleophoridae
Augasma aeratella (Zeller, 1839)
Coleophora acrisella Milliere, 1872
Coleophora adelogrammella Zeller, 1849
Coleophora agrianella Rebel, 1934
Coleophora albella (Thunberg, 1788)
Coleophora albicostella (Duponchel, 1842)
Coleophora alcyonipennella (Kollar, 1832)
Coleophora aleramica Baldizzone & Stubner, 2007
Coleophora amethystinella Ragonot, 1855
Coleophora angustiorella Fuchs, 1903
Coleophora audeoudi Rebel, 1935
Coleophora ballotella (Fischer v. Röslerstamm, 1839)
Coleophora bilineatella Zeller, 1849
Coleophora binotapennella (Duponchel, 1843)
Coleophora brevipalpella Wocke, 1874
Coleophora caespititiella Zeller, 1839
Coleophora cartilaginella Christoph, 1872
Coleophora coarctataephaga Toll, 1961
Coleophora conspicuella Zeller, 1849
Coleophora coronillae Zeller, 1849
Coleophora corsicella Walsingham, 1898
Coleophora currucipennella Zeller, 1839
Coleophora deauratella Lienig & Zeller, 1846
Coleophora dentiferella Toll, 1952
Coleophora depunctella Toll, 1961
Coleophora ditella Zeller, 1849
Coleophora eupepla Gozmany, 1954
Coleophora eupreta Walsingham, 1907
Coleophora flaviella Mann, 1857
Coleophora flavipennella (Duponchel, 1843)
Coleophora fuscociliella Zeller, 1849
Coleophora galbulipennella Zeller, 1838
Coleophora genistae Stainton, 1857
Coleophora kasyi Toll, 1961
Coleophora kautzi Rebel, 1933
Coleophora kuehnella (Goeze, 1783)
Coleophora lenae Glaser, 1969
Coleophora lessinica Baldizzone, 1980
Coleophora limosipennella (Duponchel, 1843)
Coleophora lineolea (Haworth, 1828)
Coleophora lutipennella (Zeller, 1838)
Coleophora macedonica Toll, 1959
Coleophora mayrella (Hübner, 1813)
Coleophora medelichensis Krone, 1908
Coleophora meridionella Rebel, 1912
Coleophora milvipennis Zeller, 1839
Coleophora narbonensis Baldizzone, 1990
Coleophora nigridorsella Amsel, 1935
Coleophora niveicostella Zeller, 1839
Coleophora nubivagella Zeller, 1849
Coleophora nutantella Muhlig & Frey, 1857
Coleophora obtectella Zeller, 1849
Coleophora ochrea (Haworth, 1828)
Coleophora odorariella Muhlig, 1857
Coleophora onobrychiella Zeller, 1849
Coleophora ononidella Milliere, 1879
Coleophora onopordiella Zeller, 1849
Coleophora ornatipennella (Hübner, 1796)
Coleophora otidipennella (Hübner, 1817)
Coleophora paramayrella Nel, 1993
Coleophora pennella (Denis & Schiffermüller, 1775)
Coleophora preisseckeri Toll, 1942
Coleophora quadristraminella Toll, 1961
Coleophora riffelensis Rebel, 1913
Coleophora saxicolella (Duponchel, 1843)
Coleophora scabrida Toll, 1959
Coleophora serratulella Herrich-Schäffer, 1855
Coleophora silenella Herrich-Schäffer, 1855
Coleophora sternipennella (Zetterstedt, 1839)
Coleophora stramentella Zeller, 1849
Coleophora treskaensis Toll & Amsel, 1967
Coleophora trifolii (Curtis, 1832)
Coleophora valesianella Zeller, 1849
Coleophora variicornis Toll, 1952
Coleophora vestianella (Linnaeus, 1758)
Coleophora vibicigerella Zeller, 1839
Coleophora virgatella Zeller, 1849
Coleophora vulnerariae Zeller, 1839
Coleophora vulpecula Zeller, 1849
Coleophora wockeella Zeller, 1849
Coleophora zelleriella Heinemann, 1854

Cosmopterigidae
Eteobalea albiapicella (Duponchel, 1843)
Eteobalea intermediella (Riedl, 1966)
Eteobalea isabellella (O. G. Costa, 1836)
Eteobalea serratella (Treitschke, 1833)
Eteobalea sumptuosella (Lederer, 1855)
Gisilia stereodoxa (Meyrick, 1925)
Hodgesiella rebeli (Krone, 1905)
Isidiella nickerlii (Nickerl, 1864)
Limnaecia phragmitella Stainton, 1851
Pancalia leuwenhoekella (Linnaeus, 1761)
Pancalia schwarzella (Fabricius, 1798)
Pyroderces argyrogrammos (Zeller, 1847)
Sorhagenia lophyrella (Douglas, 1846)
Stagmatophora heydeniella (Fischer von Röslerstamm, 1838)
Vulcaniella cognatella Riedl, 1990
Vulcaniella grandiferella Sinev, 1986
Vulcaniella klimeschi (Riedl, 1966)

Cossidae
Cossus cossus (Linnaeus, 1758)
Dyspessa salicicola (Eversmann, 1848)
Dyspessa ulula (Borkhausen, 1790)
Parahypopta caestrum (Hübner, 1808)
Phragmataecia castaneae (Hübner, 1790)
Zeuzera pyrina (Linnaeus, 1761)

Crambidae
Achyra nudalis (Hübner, 1796)
Agriphila brioniellus (Zerny, 1914)
Agriphila dalmatinellus (Hampson, 1900)
Agriphila deliella (Hübner, 1813)
Agriphila geniculea (Haworth, 1811)
Agriphila inquinatella (Denis & Schiffermüller, 1775)
Agriphila straminella (Denis & Schiffermüller, 1775)
Agriphila tolli (Błeszyński, 1952)
Agriphila tristella (Denis & Schiffermüller, 1775)
Agrotera nemoralis (Scopoli, 1763)
Anania coronata (Hufnagel, 1767)
Anania crocealis (Hübner, 1796)
Anania funebris (Strom, 1768)
Anania fuscalis (Denis & Schiffermüller, 1775)
Anania hortulata (Linnaeus, 1758)
Anania testacealis (Zeller, 1847)
Anania verbascalis (Denis & Schiffermüller, 1775)
Anarpia incertalis (Duponchel, 1832)
Ancylolomia palpella (Denis & Schiffermüller, 1775)
Ancylolomia pectinatellus (Zeller, 1847)
Ancylolomia tentaculella (Hübner, 1796)
Antigastra catalaunalis (Duponchel, 1833)
Aporodes floralis (Hübner, 1809)
Atralata albofascialis (Treitschke, 1829)
Calamotropha aureliellus (Fischer v. Röslerstamm, 1841)
Calamotropha paludella (Hübner, 1824)
Cataclysta lemnata (Linnaeus, 1758)
Catoptria acutangulellus (Herrich-Schäffer, 1847)
Catoptria confusellus (Staudinger, 1882)
Catoptria domaviellus (Rebel, 1904)
Catoptria falsella (Denis & Schiffermüller, 1775)
Catoptria fulgidella (Hübner, 1813)
Catoptria gozmanyi Błeszyński, 1956
Catoptria kasyi Błeszyński, 1960
Catoptria languidellus (Zeller, 1863)
Catoptria lythargyrella (Hübner, 1796)
Catoptria margaritella (Denis & Schiffermüller, 1775)
Catoptria mytilella (Hübner, 1805)
Catoptria pinella (Linnaeus, 1758)
Chilo phragmitella (Hübner, 1805)
Cholius luteolaris (Scopoli, 1772)
Chrysocrambus linetella (Fabricius, 1781)
Chrysoteuchia culmella (Linnaeus, 1758)
Crambus lathoniellus (Zincken, 1817)
Crambus pascuella (Linnaeus, 1758)
Crambus uliginosellus Zeller, 1850
Cynaeda dentalis (Denis & Schiffermüller, 1775)
Cynaeda gigantea (Wocke, 1871)
Cynaeda superba (Freyer, 1845)
Diasemia reticularis (Linnaeus, 1761)
Diasemiopsis ramburialis (Duponchel, 1834)
Dolicharthria bruguieralis (Duponchel, 1833)
Dolicharthria punctalis (Denis & Schiffermüller, 1775)
Dolicharthria stigmosalis (Herrich-Schäffer, 1848)
Donacaula forficella (Thunberg, 1794)
Donacaula mucronella (Denis & Schiffermüller, 1775)
Duponchelia fovealis Zeller, 1847
Ecpyrrhorrhoe diffusalis (Guenee, 1854)
Ecpyrrhorrhoe rubiginalis (Hübner, 1796)
Elophila nymphaeata (Linnaeus, 1758)
Epascestria pustulalis (Hübner, 1823)
Ephelis cruentalis (Geyer, 1832)
Euchromius bella (Hübner, 1796)
Euchromius ocellea (Haworth, 1811)
Euchromius superbellus (Zeller, 1849)
Euclasta splendidalis (Herrich-Schäffer, 1848)
Eudonia delunella (Stainton, 1849)
Eudonia lacustrata (Panzer, 1804)
Eudonia laetella (Zeller, 1846)
Eudonia murana (Curtis, 1827)
Eudonia pallida (Curtis, 1827)
Eudonia petrophila (Standfuss, 1848)
Eudonia phaeoleuca (Zeller, 1846)
Eurrhypis pollinalis (Denis & Schiffermüller, 1775)
Evergestis aenealis (Denis & Schiffermüller, 1775)
Evergestis caesialis (Herrich-Schäffer, 1849)
Evergestis frumentalis (Linnaeus, 1761)
Evergestis limbata (Linnaeus, 1767)
Evergestis segetalis (Herrich-Schäffer, 1851)
Evergestis serratalis (Staudinger, 1871)
Evergestis sophialis (Fabricius, 1787)
Evergestis subfuscalis (Staudinger, 1871)
Friedlanderia cicatricella (Hübner, 1824)
Heliothela wulfeniana (Scopoli, 1763)
Hyperlais argillacealis (Zeller, 1847)
Hyperlais dulcinalis (Treitschke, 1835)
Loxostege aeruginalis (Hübner, 1796)
Loxostege deliblatica Szent-Ivany & Uhrik-Meszaros, 1942
Loxostege manualis (Geyer, 1832)
Loxostege mucosalis (Herrich-Schäffer, 1848)
Loxostege sticticalis (Linnaeus, 1761)
Mecyna flavalis (Denis & Schiffermüller, 1775)
Mecyna lutealis (Duponchel, 1833)
Mecyna trinalis (Denis & Schiffermüller, 1775)
Mesocrambus candiellus (Herrich-Schäffer, 1848)
Metacrambus carectellus (Zeller, 1847)
Metasia carnealis (Treitschke, 1829)
Metasia ophialis (Treitschke, 1829)
Metasia suppandalis (Hübner, 1823)
Metaxmeste phrygialis (Hübner, 1796)
Metaxmeste schrankiana (Hochenwarth, 1785)
Neocrambus wolfschlaegeri (Schawerda, 1937)
Nomophila noctuella (Denis & Schiffermüller, 1775)
Nymphula nitidulata (Hufnagel, 1767)
Orenaia alpestralis (Fabricius, 1787)
Ostrinia nubilalis (Hübner, 1796)
Ostrinia quadripunctalis (Denis & Schiffermüller, 1775)
Palpita vitrealis (Rossi, 1794)
Paracorsia repandalis (Denis & Schiffermüller, 1775)
Parapoynx stratiotata (Linnaeus, 1758)
Paratalanta hyalinalis (Hübner, 1796)
Pediasia contaminella (Hübner, 1796)
Pediasia jucundellus (Herrich-Schäffer, 1847)
Pediasia luteella (Denis & Schiffermüller, 1775)
Pediasia matricella (Treitschke, 1832)
Platytes cerussella (Denis & Schiffermüller, 1775)
Pleuroptya balteata (Fabricius, 1798)
Pleuroptya ruralis (Scopoli, 1763)
Psammotis pulveralis (Hübner, 1796)
Pyrausta aerealis (Hübner, 1793)
Pyrausta aurata (Scopoli, 1763)
Pyrausta castalis Treitschke, 1829
Pyrausta cingulata (Linnaeus, 1758)
Pyrausta coracinalis Leraut, 1982
Pyrausta despicata (Scopoli, 1763)
Pyrausta falcatalis Guenee, 1854
Pyrausta obfuscata (Scopoli, 1763)
Pyrausta ostrinalis (Hübner, 1796)
Pyrausta purpuralis (Linnaeus, 1758)
Pyrausta sanguinalis (Linnaeus, 1767)
Pyrausta trimaculalis (Staudinger, 1867)
Pyrausta virginalis Duponchel, 1832
Schoenobius gigantella (Denis & Schiffermüller, 1775)
Scirpophaga praelata (Scopoli, 1763)
Scoparia ambigualis (Treitschke, 1829)
Scoparia basistrigalis Knaggs, 1866
Scoparia ingratella (Zeller, 1846)
Scoparia manifestella (Herrich-Schäffer, 1848)
Scoparia perplexella (Zeller, 1839)
Scoparia pyralella (Denis & Schiffermüller, 1775)
Scoparia subfusca Haworth, 1811
Sitochroa palealis (Denis & Schiffermüller, 1775)
Sitochroa verticalis (Linnaeus, 1758)
Tegostoma comparalis (Hübner, 1796)
Thisanotia chrysonuchella (Scopoli, 1763)
Titanio normalis (Hübner, 1796)
Titanio venustalis (Lederer, 1855)
Udea ferrugalis (Hübner, 1796)
Udea fimbriatralis (Duponchel, 1834)
Udea fulvalis (Hübner, 1809)
Udea institalis (Hübner, 1819)
Udea olivalis (Denis & Schiffermüller, 1775)
Udea prunalis (Denis & Schiffermüller, 1775)
Udea rhododendronalis (Duponchel, 1834)
Udea uliginosalis (Stephens, 1834)
Uresiphita gilvata (Fabricius, 1794)
Xanthocrambus saxonellus (Zincken, 1821)

Douglasiidae
Klimeschia transversella (Zeller, 1839)
Tinagma hedemanni (Caradja, 1920)
Tinagma ocnerostomella (Stainton, 1850)
Tinagma perdicella Zeller, 1839

Drepanidae
Asphalia ruficollis (Denis & Schiffermüller, 1775)
Cilix asiatica O. Bang-Haas, 1907
Cilix glaucata (Scopoli, 1763)
Cymatophorina diluta (Denis & Schiffermüller, 1775)
Drepana falcataria (Linnaeus, 1758)
Habrosyne pyritoides (Hufnagel, 1766)
Polyploca ridens (Fabricius, 1787)
Tethea ocularis (Linnaeus, 1767)
Tethea or (Denis & Schiffermüller, 1775)
Thyatira batis (Linnaeus, 1758)
Watsonalla binaria (Hufnagel, 1767)
Watsonalla cultraria (Fabricius, 1775)
Watsonalla uncinula (Borkhausen, 1790)

Elachistidae
Agonopterix adspersella (Kollar, 1832)
Agonopterix alstromeriana (Clerck, 1759)
Agonopterix cervariella (Constant, 1884)
Agonopterix cnicella (Treitschke, 1832)
Agonopterix curvipunctosa (Haworth, 1811)
Agonopterix doronicella (Wocke, 1849)
Agonopterix furvella (Treitschke, 1832)
Agonopterix heracliana (Linnaeus, 1758)
Agonopterix kaekeritziana (Linnaeus, 1767)
Agonopterix laterella (Denis & Schiffermüller, 1775)
Agonopterix nanatella (Stainton, 1849)
Agonopterix nodiflorella (Milliere, 1866)
Agonopterix ocellana (Fabricius, 1775)
Agonopterix oinochroa (Turati, 1879)
Agonopterix pallorella (Zeller, 1839)
Agonopterix propinquella (Treitschke, 1835)
Agonopterix purpurea (Haworth, 1811)
Agonopterix quadripunctata (Wocke, 1857)
Agonopterix rutana (Fabricius, 1794)
Agonopterix squamosa (Mann, 1864)
Agonopterix subpropinquella (Stainton, 1849)
Agonopterix thurneri (Rebel, 1941)
Agonopterix yeatiana (Fabricius, 1781)
Anchinia daphnella (Denis & Schiffermüller, 1775)
Anchinia laureolella Herrich-Schäffer, 1854
Blastodacna atra (Haworth, 1828)
Cacochroa permixtella (Herrich-Schäffer, 1854)
Chrysoclista splendida Karsholt, 1997
Depressaria absynthiella Herrich-Schäffer, 1865
Depressaria albipunctella (Denis & Schiffermüller, 1775)
Depressaria badiella (Hübner, 1796)
Depressaria beckmanni Heinemann, 1870
Depressaria chaerophylli Zeller, 1839
Depressaria depressana (Fabricius, 1775)
Depressaria discipunctella Herrich-Schäffer, 1854
Depressaria douglasella Stainton, 1849
Depressaria libanotidella Schlager, 1849
Depressaria marcella Rebel, 1901
Depressaria radiella (Goeze, 1783)
Depressaria tenebricosa Zeller, 1854
Depressaria ululana Rossler, 1866
Depressaria erinaceella Staudinger, 1870
Depressaria hirtipalpis Zeller, 1854
Depressaria dictamnella (Treitschke, 1835)
Depressaria moranella Chretien, 1907
Dystebenna stephensi (Stainton, 1849)
Elachista drenovoi Parenti, 1981
Elachista dumosa Parenti, 1981
Elachista maculata Parenti, 1978
Elachista occulta Parenti, 1978
Elachista ohridella Parenti, 2001
Elachista vegliae Parenti, 1978
Ethmia aurifluella (Hübner, 1810)
Ethmia bipunctella (Fabricius, 1775)
Ethmia candidella (Alphéraky, 1908)
Ethmia chrysopygella (Kolenati, 1846)
Ethmia flavianella (Treitschke, 1832)
Ethmia haemorrhoidella (Eversmann, 1844)
Ethmia terminella T. B. Fletcher, 1938
Ethmia tripunctella (Staudinger, 1879)
Exaeretia culcitella (Herrich-Schäffer, 1854)
Exaeretia ledereri (Zeller, 1854)
Exaeretia lutosella (Herrich-Schäffer, 1854)
Fuchsia luteella (Heinemann, 1870)
Haplochrois albanica (Rebel & Zerny, 1932)
Haplochrois ochraceella (Rebel, 1903)
Heinemannia festivella (Denis & Schiffermüller, 1775)
Heinemannia laspeyrella (Hübner, 1796)
Hypercallia citrinalis (Scopoli, 1763)
Luquetia lobella (Denis & Schiffermüller, 1775)
Luquetia orientella (Rebel, 1893)
Orophia denisella (Denis & Schiffermüller, 1775)
Orophia ferrugella (Denis & Schiffermüller, 1775)
Orophia sordidella (Hübner, 1796)
Spuleria flavicaput (Haworth, 1828)
Telechrysis tripuncta (Haworth, 1828)

Endromidae
Endromis versicolora (Linnaeus, 1758)

Epermeniidae
Epermenia aequidentellus (E. Hofmann, 1867)
Epermenia illigerella (Hübner, 1813)
Epermenia insecurella (Stainton, 1854)
Epermenia ochreomaculellus (Milliere, 1854)
Epermenia pontificella (Hübner, 1796)
Ochromolopis ictella (Hübner, 1813)

Erebidae
Amata kruegeri (Ragusa, 1904)
Amata phegea (Linnaeus, 1758)
Apopestes spectrum (Esper, 1787)
Arctia caja (Linnaeus, 1758)
Arctia festiva (Hufnagel, 1766)
Arctia villica (Linnaeus, 1758)
Arctornis l-nigrum (Muller, 1764)
Autophila dilucida (Hübner, 1808)
Autophila limbata (Staudinger, 1871)
Autophila anaphanes Boursin, 1940
Callimorpha dominula (Linnaeus, 1758)
Calliteara pudibunda (Linnaeus, 1758)
Calymma communimacula (Denis & Schiffermüller, 1775)
Calyptra thalictri (Borkhausen, 1790)
Catephia alchymista (Denis & Schiffermüller, 1775)
Catocala coniuncta (Esper, 1787)
Catocala conversa (Esper, 1783)
Catocala dilecta (Hübner, 1808)
Catocala disjuncta (Geyer, 1828)
Catocala diversa (Geyer, 1828)
Catocala electa (Vieweg, 1790)
Catocala elocata (Esper, 1787)
Catocala fraxini (Linnaeus, 1758)
Catocala fulminea (Scopoli, 1763)
Catocala hymenaea (Denis & Schiffermüller, 1775)
Catocala lupina Herrich-Schäffer, 1851
Catocala nupta (Linnaeus, 1767)
Catocala nymphaea (Esper, 1787)
Catocala nymphagoga (Esper, 1787)
Catocala promissa (Denis & Schiffermüller, 1775)
Catocala puerpera (Giorna, 1791)
Catocala sponsa (Linnaeus, 1767)
Chelis maculosa (Gerning, 1780)
Clytie syriaca (Bugnion, 1837)
Colobochyla salicalis (Denis & Schiffermüller, 1775)
Coscinia cribraria (Linnaeus, 1758)
Coscinia striata (Linnaeus, 1758)
Cybosia mesomella (Linnaeus, 1758)
Cymbalophora rivularis (Menetries, 1832)
Diacrisia sannio (Linnaeus, 1758)
Diaphora mendica (Clerck, 1759)
Drasteria cailino (Lefebvre, 1827)
Dysauxes ancilla (Linnaeus, 1767)
Dysauxes famula (Freyer, 1836)
Dysauxes punctata (Fabricius, 1781)
Dysgonia algira (Linnaeus, 1767)
Dysgonia torrida (Guenee, 1852)
Eilema caniola (Hübner, 1808)
Eilema complana (Linnaeus, 1758)
Eilema costalis (Zeller, 1847)
Eilema lurideola (Zincken, 1817)
Eilema palliatella (Scopoli, 1763)
Eilema pygmaeola (Doubleday, 1847)
Eilema sororcula (Hufnagel, 1766)
Eublemma amoena (Hübner, 1803)
Eublemma himmighoffeni (Milliere, 1867)
Eublemma minutata (Fabricius, 1794)
Eublemma ochreola (Staudinger, 1900)
Eublemma ostrina (Hübner, 1808)
Eublemma parva (Hübner, 1808)
Eublemma polygramma (Duponchel, 1842)
Eublemma purpurina (Denis & Schiffermüller, 1775)
Eublemma scitula Rambur, 1833
Eublemma viridula (Guenee, 1841)
Euclidia mi (Clerck, 1759)
Euclidia glyphica (Linnaeus, 1758)
Euclidia triquetra (Denis & Schiffermüller, 1775)
Euplagia quadripunctaria (Poda, 1761)
Euproctis chrysorrhoea (Linnaeus, 1758)
Euproctis similis (Fuessly, 1775)
Exophyla rectangularis (Geyer, 1828)
Grammodes bifasciata (Petagna, 1787)
Grammodes stolida (Fabricius, 1775)
Gynaephora selenitica (Esper, 1789)
Herminia grisealis (Denis & Schiffermüller, 1775)
Herminia tarsicrinalis (Knoch, 1782)
Herminia tarsipennalis (Treitschke, 1835)
Herminia tenuialis (Rebel, 1899)
Hypena crassalis (Fabricius, 1787)
Hypena obesalis Treitschke, 1829
Hypena obsitalis (Hübner, 1813)
Hypena palpalis (Hübner, 1796)
Hypena proboscidalis (Linnaeus, 1758)
Hypena rostralis (Linnaeus, 1758)
Hypenodes anatolica Schwingenschuss, 1938
Hypenodes humidalis Doubleday, 1850
Hyphoraia aulica (Linnaeus, 1758)
Idia calvaria (Denis & Schiffermüller, 1775)
Laspeyria flexula (Denis & Schiffermüller, 1775)
Leucoma salicis (Linnaeus, 1758)
Lithosia quadra (Linnaeus, 1758)
Lygephila craccae (Denis & Schiffermüller, 1775)
Lygephila lusoria (Linnaeus, 1758)
Lygephila pastinum (Treitschke, 1826)
Lygephila procax (Hübner, 1813)
Lygephila viciae (Hübner, 1822)
Lymantria dispar (Linnaeus, 1758)
Lymantria monacha (Linnaeus, 1758)
Metachrostis dardouini (Boisduval, 1840)
Metachrostis velox (Hübner, 1813)
Miltochrista miniata (Forster, 1771)
Minucia lunaris (Denis & Schiffermüller, 1775)
Nodaria nodosalis (Herrich-Schäffer, 1851)
Ocneria rubea (Denis & Schiffermüller, 1775)
Ocnogyna parasita (Hübner, 1790)
Odice arcuinna (Hübner, 1790)
Odice suava (Hübner, 1813)
Ophiusa tirhaca (Cramer, 1773)
Orectis proboscidata (Herrich-Schäffer, 1851)
Orgyia dubia (Tauscher, 1806)
Paracolax tristalis (Fabricius, 1794)
Parascotia fuliginaria (Linnaeus, 1761)
Parasemia plantaginis (Linnaeus, 1758)
Parocneria detrita (Esper, 1785)
Parocneria terebinthi (Freyer, 1838)
Pechipogo plumigeralis Hübner, 1825
Pechipogo strigilata (Linnaeus, 1758)
Pelosia muscerda (Hufnagel, 1766)
Penthophera morio (Linnaeus, 1767)
Phragmatobia fuliginosa (Linnaeus, 1758)
Phragmatobia placida (Frivaldszky, 1835)
Phytometra viridaria (Clerck, 1759)
Polypogon gryphalis (Herrich-Schäffer, 1851)
Polypogon tentacularia (Linnaeus, 1758)
Rhypagla lacernaria (Hübner, 1813)
Rhyparia purpurata (Linnaeus, 1758)
Rivula sericealis (Scopoli, 1763)
Schrankia costaestrigalis (Stephens, 1834)
Schrankia taenialis (Hübner, 1809)
Scoliopteryx libatrix (Linnaeus, 1758)
Setina irrorella (Linnaeus, 1758)
Simplicia rectalis (Eversmann, 1842)
Spilosoma lubricipeda (Linnaeus, 1758)
Spilosoma lutea (Hufnagel, 1766)
Spilosoma urticae (Esper, 1789)
Tathorhynchus exsiccata (Lederer, 1855)
Trisateles emortualis (Denis & Schiffermüller, 1775)
Tyria jacobaeae (Linnaeus, 1758)
Utetheisa pulchella (Linnaeus, 1758)
Watsonarctia deserta (Bartel, 1902)
Zanclognatha zelleralis (Wocke, 1850)
Zebeeba falsalis (Herrich-Schäffer, 1839)
Zekelita antiqualis (Hübner, 1809)
Zethes insularis Rambur, 1833

Eriocraniidae
Dyseriocrania subpurpurella (Haworth, 1828)

Euteliidae
Eutelia adoratrix (Staudinger, 1892)
Eutelia adulatrix (Hübner, 1813)

Gelechiidae
Acompsia cinerella (Clerck, 1759)
Acompsia ponomarenkoae Huemer & Karsholt, 2002
Agnippe lunaki (Rebel, 1941)
Altenia elsneriella Huemer & Karsholt, 1999
Altenia scriptella (Hübner, 1796)
Altenia wagneriella (Rebel, 1926)
Anacampsis timidella (Wocke, 1887)
Anarsia lineatella Zeller, 1839
Anarsia spartiella (Schrank, 1802)
Apodia bifractella (Duponchel, 1843)
Aproaerema anthyllidella (Hübner, 1813)
Aristotelia decurtella (Hübner, 1813)
Aristotelia subericinella (Duponchel, 1843)
Aroga aristotelis (Milliere, 1876)
Aroga balcanicola Huemer & Karsholt, 1999
Aroga flavicomella (Zeller, 1839)
Aroga velocella (Duponchel, 1838)
Athrips rancidella (Herrich-Schäffer, 1854)
Brachmia blandella (Fabricius, 1798)
Brachmia dimidiella (Denis & Schiffermüller, 1775)
Bryotropha arabica Amsel, 1952
Bryotropha azovica Bidzilia, 1997
Bryotropha domestica (Haworth, 1828)
Bryotropha hendrikseni Karsholt & Rutten, 2005
Bryotropha hulli Karsholt & Rutten, 2005
Bryotropha plebejella (Zeller, 1847)
Bryotropha sabulosella (Rebel, 1905)
Bryotropha senectella (Zeller, 1839)
Bryotropha terrella (Denis & Schiffermüller, 1775)
Carpatolechia decorella (Haworth, 1812)
Carpatolechia fugacella (Zeller, 1839)
Caryocolum alsinella (Zeller, 1868)
Caryocolum cauligenella (Schmid, 1863)
Caryocolum fischerella (Treitschke, 1833)
Caryocolum inflativorella (Klimesch, 1938)
Caryocolum leucomelanella (Zeller, 1839)
Caryocolum marmorea (Haworth, 1828)
Caryocolum mucronatella (Chretien, 1900)
Caryocolum peregrinella (Herrich-Schäffer, 1854)
Caryocolum petrophila (Preissecker, 1914)
Caryocolum proxima (Haworth, 1828)
Caryocolum saginella (Zeller, 1868)
Caryocolum schleichi (Christoph, 1872)
Caryocolum tischeriella (Zeller, 1839)
Catatinagma trivittellum Rebel, 1903
Chionodes distinctella (Zeller, 1839)
Chrysoesthia drurella (Fabricius, 1775)
Chrysoesthia sexguttella (Thunberg, 1794)
Crossobela trinotella (Herrich-Schäffer, 1856)
Dichomeris alacella (Zeller, 1839)
Dichomeris barbella (Denis & Schiffermüller, 1775)
Dichomeris juniperella (Linnaeus, 1761)
Dichomeris limbipunctellus (Staudinger, 1859)
Dichomeris limosellus (Schlager, 1849)
Dichomeris marginella (Fabricius, 1781)
Ephysteris diminutella (Zeller, 1847)
Ephysteris promptella (Staudinger, 1859)
Eulamprotes wilkella (Linnaeus, 1758)
Filatima spurcella (Duponchel, 1843)
Filatima tephritidella (Duponchel, 1844)
Gelechia dujardini Huemer, 1991
Gelechia senticetella (Staudinger, 1859)
Gnorimoschema herbichii (Nowicki, 1864)
Helcystogramma triannulella (Herrich-Schäffer, 1854)
Isophrictis anthemidella (Wocke, 1871)
Isophrictis kefersteiniellus (Zeller, 1850)
Isophrictis striatella (Denis & Schiffermüller, 1775)
Istrianis femoralis (Staudinger, 1876)
Klimeschiopsis kiningerella (Duponchel, 1843)
Megacraspedus binotella (Duponchel, 1843)
Megacraspedus dolosellus (Zeller, 1839)
Mesophleps silacella (Hübner, 1796)
Metzneria aestivella (Zeller, 1839)
Metzneria aprilella (Herrich-Schäffer, 1854)
Metzneria artificella (Herrich-Schäffer, 1861)
Metzneria intestinella (Mann, 1864)
Metzneria lappella (Linnaeus, 1758)
Metzneria neuropterella (Zeller, 1839)
Metzneria paucipunctella (Zeller, 1839)
Mirificarma cytisella (Treitschke, 1833)
Mirificarma eburnella (Denis & Schiffermüller, 1775)
Mirificarma maculatella (Hübner, 1796)
Monochroa conspersella (Herrich-Schäffer, 1854)
Monochroa cytisella (Curtis, 1837)
Monochroa lucidella (Stephens, 1834)
Monochroa nomadella (Zeller, 1868)
Monochroa sepicolella (Herrich-Schäffer, 1854)
Neotelphusa sequax (Haworth, 1828)
Nothris congressariella (Bruand, 1858)
Nothris lemniscellus (Zeller, 1839)
Nothris radiata (Staudinger, 1879)
Nothris verbascella (Denis & Schiffermüller, 1775)
Ornativalva plutelliformis (Staudinger, 1859)
Parachronistis albiceps (Zeller, 1839)
Parastenolechia nigrinotella (Zeller, 1847)
Pexicopia malvella (Hübner, 1805)
Phthorimaea operculella (Zeller, 1873)
Platyedra subcinerea (Haworth, 1828)
Prolita sexpunctella (Fabricius, 1794)
Prolita solutella (Zeller, 1839)
Pseudotelphusa istrella (Mann, 1866)
Pseudotelphusa paripunctella (Thunberg, 1794)
Psoricoptera gibbosella (Zeller, 1839)
Ptocheuusa abnormella (Herrich-Schäffer, 1854)
Ptocheuusa paupella (Zeller, 1847)
Pyncostola bohemiella (Nickerl, 1864)
Recurvaria nanella (Denis & Schiffermüller, 1775)
Scrobipalpa acuminatella (Sircom, 1850)
Scrobipalpa artemisiella (Treitschke, 1833)
Scrobipalpa atriplicella (Fischer von Röslerstamm, 1841)
Scrobipalpa ergasima (Meyrick, 1916)
Scrobipalpa erichi Povolny, 1964
Scrobipalpa kasyi Povolny, 1968
Scrobipalpa mixta Huemer & Karsholt, 2010
Scrobipalpa ocellatella (Boyd, 1858)
Scrobipalpa perinii (Klimesch, 1951)
Scrobipalpula seniorum Povolny, 2000
Scrobipalpula tussilaginis (Stainton, 1867)
Sitotroga cerealella (Olivier, 1789)
Sophronia ascalis Gozmany, 1951
Sophronia humerella (Denis & Schiffermüller, 1775)
Sophronia sicariellus (Zeller, 1839)
Stenolechiodes pseudogemmellus Elsner, 1996
Stomopteryx detersella (Zeller, 1847)
Stomopteryx remissella (Zeller, 1847)
Syncopacma cinctella (Clerck, 1759)
Syncopacma coronillella (Treitschke, 1833)
Syncopacma patruella (Mann, 1857)
Syncopacma polychromella (Rebel, 1902)
Syncopacma taeniolella (Zeller, 1839)
Teleiopsis bagriotella (Duponchel, 1840)
Teleiopsis diffinis (Haworth, 1828)
Teleiopsis latisacculus Pitkin, 1988
Teleiopsis rosalbella (Fologne, 1862)
Teleiopsis terebinthinella (Herrich-Schäffer, 1856)
Thiotricha subocellea (Stephens, 1834)
Xenolechia aethiops (Humphreys & Westwood, 1845)

Geometridae
Abraxas grossulariata (Linnaeus, 1758)
Aethalura punctulata (Denis & Schiffermüller, 1775)
Alcis bastelbergeri (Hirschke, 1908)
Alcis jubata (Thunberg, 1788)
Alcis repandata (Linnaeus, 1758)
Aleucis distinctata (Herrich-Schäffer, 1839)
Alsophila aceraria (Denis & Schiffermüller, 1775)
Alsophila aescularia (Denis & Schiffermüller, 1775)
Anticlea derivata (Denis & Schiffermüller, 1775)
Apeira syringaria (Linnaeus, 1758)
Aplasta ononaria (Fuessly, 1783)
Aplocera efformata (Guenee, 1858)
Aplocera plagiata (Linnaeus, 1758)
Aplocera praeformata (Hübner, 1826)
Aplocera simpliciata (Treitschke, 1835)
Apocheima hispidaria (Denis & Schiffermüller, 1775)
Apochima flabellaria (Heeger, 1838)
Arichanna melanaria (Linnaeus, 1758)
Artiora evonymaria (Denis & Schiffermüller, 1775)
Ascotis selenaria (Denis & Schiffermüller, 1775)
Aspitates gilvaria (Denis & Schiffermüller, 1775)
Aspitates ochrearia (Rossi, 1794)
Asthena albulata (Hufnagel, 1767)
Asthena anseraria (Herrich-Schäffer, 1855)
Biston betularia (Linnaeus, 1758)
Biston strataria (Hufnagel, 1767)
Cabera exanthemata (Scopoli, 1763)
Campaea honoraria (Denis & Schiffermüller, 1775)
Campaea margaritaria (Linnaeus, 1761)
Camptogramma bilineata (Linnaeus, 1758)
Camptogramma scripturata (Hübner, 1799)
Cataclysme riguata (Hübner, 1813)
Catarhoe cuculata (Hufnagel, 1767)
Catarhoe permixtaria (Herrich-Schäffer, 1856)
Catarhoe putridaria (Herrich-Schäffer, 1852)
Catarhoe rubidata (Denis & Schiffermüller, 1775)
Celonoptera mirificaria Lederer, 1862
Chariaspilates formosaria (Eversmann, 1837)
Charissa certhiatus (Rebel & Zerny, 1931)
Charissa obscurata (Denis & Schiffermüller, 1775)
Charissa pentheri (Rebel, 1904)
Charissa pullata (Denis & Schiffermüller, 1775)
Charissa variegata (Duponchel, 1830)
Charissa ambiguata (Duponchel, 1830)
Charissa onustaria (Herrich-Schäffer, 1852)
Charissa intermedia (Wehrli, 1917)
Charissa supinaria (Mann, 1854)
Charissa glaucinaria (Hübner, 1799)
Chesias rufata (Fabricius, 1775)
Chiasmia aestimaria (Hübner, 1809)
Chiasmia clathrata (Linnaeus, 1758)
Chlorissa cloraria (Hübner, 1813)
Chlorissa viridata (Linnaeus, 1758)
Chloroclysta siterata (Hufnagel, 1767)
Chloroclystis v-ata (Haworth, 1809)
Cidaria fulvata (Forster, 1771)
Cleora cinctaria (Denis & Schiffermüller, 1775)
Cleorodes lichenaria (Hufnagel, 1767)
Cleta filacearia (Herrich-Schäffer, 1847)
Coenotephria ablutaria (Boisduval, 1840)
Coenotephria tophaceata (Denis & Schiffermüller, 1775)
Colostygia aptata (Hübner, 1813)
Colostygia aqueata (Hübner, 1813)
Colostygia pectinataria (Knoch, 1781)
Colostygia turbata (Hübner, 1799)
Colostygia wolfschlaegerae (Pinker, 1953)
Colotois pennaria (Linnaeus, 1761)
Comibaena bajularia (Denis & Schiffermüller, 1775)
Cosmorhoe ocellata (Linnaeus, 1758)
Costaconvexa polygrammata (Borkhausen, 1794)
Crocallis elinguaria (Linnaeus, 1758)
Crocallis tusciaria (Borkhausen, 1793)
Cyclophora linearia (Hübner, 1799)
Cyclophora porata (Linnaeus, 1767)
Cyclophora punctaria (Linnaeus, 1758)
Cyclophora suppunctaria (Zeller, 1847)
Cyclophora albiocellaria (Hübner, 1789)
Cyclophora annularia (Fabricius, 1775)
Cyclophora puppillaria (Hübner, 1799)
Cyclophora quercimontaria (Bastelberger, 1897)
Cyclophora ruficiliaria (Herrich-Schäffer, 1855)
Dasycorsa modesta (Staudinger, 1879)
Deileptenia ribeata (Clerck, 1759)
Docirava dervenaria (von Mentzer, 1981)
Dyscia innocentaria (Christoph, 1885)
Dysstroma truncata (Hufnagel, 1767)
Earophila badiata (Denis & Schiffermüller, 1775)
Ectropis crepuscularia (Denis & Schiffermüller, 1775)
Eilicrinia cordiaria (Hübner, 1790)
Eilicrinia trinotata (Metzner, 1845)
Ematurga atomaria (Linnaeus, 1758)
Enanthyperythra legataria (Herrich-Schäffer, 1852)
Ennomos alniaria (Linnaeus, 1758)
Ennomos autumnaria (Werneburg, 1859)
Ennomos erosaria (Denis & Schiffermüller, 1775)
Ennomos fuscantaria (Haworth, 1809)
Ennomos quercaria (Hübner, 1813)
Ennomos quercinaria (Hufnagel, 1767)
Entephria caesiata (Denis & Schiffermüller, 1775)
Entephria cyanata (Hübner, 1809)
Entephria flavicinctata (Hübner, 1813)
Entephria nobiliaria (Herrich-Schäffer, 1852)
Epione repandaria (Hufnagel, 1767)
Epirrhoe alternata (Muller, 1764)
Epirrhoe galiata (Denis & Schiffermüller, 1775)
Epirrhoe molluginata (Hübner, 1813)
Epirrhoe rivata (Hübner, 1813)
Epirrhoe tristata (Linnaeus, 1758)
Epirrita dilutata (Denis & Schiffermüller, 1775)
Epirrita terminassianae Vardikian, 1974
Eucrostes indigenata (de Villers, 1789)
Eulithis populata (Linnaeus, 1758)
Eulithis prunata (Linnaeus, 1758)
Eumannia oppositaria (Mann, 1864)
Eumera regina Staudinger, 1892
Euphyia frustata (Treitschke, 1828)
Euphyia mesembrina (Rebel, 1927)
Eupithecia abbreviata Stephens, 1831
Eupithecia addictata Dietze, 1908
Eupithecia alliaria Staudinger, 1870
Eupithecia breviculata (Donzel, 1837)
Eupithecia carpophagata Staudinger, 1871
Eupithecia centaureata (Denis & Schiffermüller, 1775)
Eupithecia cocciferata Milliere, 1864
Eupithecia cretaceata (Packard, 1874)
Eupithecia cuculliaria (Rebel, 1901)
Eupithecia denotata (Hübner, 1813)
Eupithecia distinctaria Herrich-Schäffer, 1848
Eupithecia dodoneata Guenee, 1858
Eupithecia druentiata Dietze, 1902
Eupithecia ericeata (Rambur, 1833)
Eupithecia extraversaria Herrich-Schäffer, 1852
Eupithecia extremata (Fabricius, 1787)
Eupithecia fuscicostata Christoph, 1887
Eupithecia gemellata Herrich-Schäffer, 1861
Eupithecia graphata (Treitschke, 1828)
Eupithecia gueneata Milliere, 1862
Eupithecia haworthiata Doubleday, 1856
Eupithecia icterata (de Villers, 1789)
Eupithecia impurata (Hübner, 1813)
Eupithecia innotata (Hufnagel, 1767)
Eupithecia insigniata (Hübner, 1790)
Eupithecia intricata (Zetterstedt, 1839)
Eupithecia irriguata (Hübner, 1813)
Eupithecia lanceata (Hübner, 1825)
Eupithecia laquaearia Herrich-Schäffer, 1848
Eupithecia lariciata (Freyer, 1841)
Eupithecia limbata Staudinger, 1879
Eupithecia linariata (Denis & Schiffermüller, 1775)
Eupithecia mystica Dietze, 1910
Eupithecia ochridata Schutze & Pinker, 1968
Eupithecia orphnata W. Petersen, 1909
Eupithecia pusillata (Denis & Schiffermüller, 1775)
Eupithecia pyreneata Mabille, 1871
Eupithecia quercetica Prout, 1938
Eupithecia satyrata (Hübner, 1813)
Eupithecia schiefereri Bohatsch, 1893
Eupithecia semigraphata Bruand, 1850
Eupithecia silenicolata Mabille, 1867
Eupithecia spissilineata (Metzner, 1846)
Eupithecia subfuscata (Haworth, 1809)
Eupithecia tenuiata (Hübner, 1813)
Eupithecia thurnerata Schutze, 1958
Eupithecia tripunctaria Herrich-Schäffer, 1852
Eupithecia trisignaria Herrich-Schäffer, 1848
Eupithecia undata (Freyer, 1840)
Eupithecia venosata (Fabricius, 1787)
Eupithecia veratraria Herrich-Schäffer, 1848
Eupithecia vulgata (Haworth, 1809)
Fagivorina arenaria (Hufnagel, 1767)
Gandaritis pyraliata (Denis & Schiffermüller, 1775)
Geometra papilionaria (Linnaeus, 1758)
Glacies canaliculata (Hochenwarth, 1785)
Gnopharmia stevenaria (Boisduval, 1840)
Gnophos sartata Treitschke, 1827
Gnophos furvata (Denis & Schiffermüller, 1775)
Gnophos obfuscata (Denis & Schiffermüller, 1775)
Gnophos dumetata Treitschke, 1827
Gymnoscelis rufifasciata (Haworth, 1809)
Heliomata glarearia (Denis & Schiffermüller, 1775)
Hemistola chrysoprasaria (Esper, 1795)
Hemithea aestivaria (Hübner, 1789)
Holoterpna pruinosata (Staudinger, 1897)
Horisme aemulata (Hübner, 1813)
Horisme calligraphata (Herrich-Schäffer, 1838)
Horisme corticata (Treitschke, 1835)
Horisme tersata (Denis & Schiffermüller, 1775)
Horisme vitalbata (Denis & Schiffermüller, 1775)
Hydrelia flammeolaria (Hufnagel, 1767)
Hydrelia sylvata (Denis & Schiffermüller, 1775)
Hydriomena furcata (Thunberg, 1784)
Hylaea fasciaria (Linnaeus, 1758)
Hypomecis punctinalis (Scopoli, 1763)
Hypomecis roboraria (Denis & Schiffermüller, 1775)
Hypoxystis pluviaria (Fabricius, 1787)
Idaea albitorquata (Pungeler, 1909)
Idaea aureolaria (Denis & Schiffermüller, 1775)
Idaea aversata (Linnaeus, 1758)
Idaea biselata (Hufnagel, 1767)
Idaea camparia (Herrich-Schäffer, 1852)
Idaea circuitaria (Hübner, 1819)
Idaea consanguinaria (Lederer, 1853)
Idaea consolidata (Lederer, 1853)
Idaea contiguaria (Hübner, 1799)
Idaea degeneraria (Hübner, 1799)
Idaea determinata (Staudinger, 1876)
Idaea deversaria (Herrich-Schäffer, 1847)
Idaea dilutaria (Hübner, 1799)
Idaea dimidiata (Hufnagel, 1767)
Idaea distinctaria (Boisduval, 1840)
Idaea elongaria (Rambur, 1833)
Idaea filicata (Hübner, 1799)
Idaea fuscovenosa (Goeze, 1781)
Idaea humiliata (Hufnagel, 1767)
Idaea inquinata (Scopoli, 1763)
Idaea laevigata (Scopoli, 1763)
Idaea metohiensis (Rebel, 1900)
Idaea moniliata (Denis & Schiffermüller, 1775)
Idaea obsoletaria (Rambur, 1833)
Idaea ochrata (Scopoli, 1763)
Idaea ossiculata (Lederer, 1870)
Idaea ostrinaria (Hübner, 1813)
Idaea pallidata (Denis & Schiffermüller, 1775)
Idaea politaria (Hübner, 1799)
Idaea rubraria (Staudinger, 1901)
Idaea rufaria (Hübner, 1799)
Idaea rusticata (Denis & Schiffermüller, 1775)
Idaea seriata (Schrank, 1802)
Idaea serpentata (Hufnagel, 1767)
Idaea straminata (Borkhausen, 1794)
Idaea subsericeata (Haworth, 1809)
Idaea trigeminata (Haworth, 1809)
Isturgia arenacearia (Denis & Schiffermüller, 1775)
Isturgia roraria (Fabricius, 1776)
Larentia clavaria (Haworth, 1809)
Ligdia adustata (Denis & Schiffermüller, 1775)
Lithostege farinata (Hufnagel, 1767)
Lithostege griseata (Denis & Schiffermüller, 1775)
Lobophora halterata (Hufnagel, 1767)
Lomaspilis marginata (Linnaeus, 1758)
Lomographa bimaculata (Fabricius, 1775)
Lomographa temerata (Denis & Schiffermüller, 1775)
Lycia graecarius (Staudinger, 1861)
Lycia hirtaria (Clerck, 1759)
Lythria cruentaria (Hufnagel, 1767)
Lythria purpuraria (Linnaeus, 1758)
Macaria fusca (Thunberg, 1792)
Melanthia procellata (Denis & Schiffermüller, 1775)
Menophra abruptaria (Thunberg, 1792)
Mesoleuca albicillata (Linnaeus, 1758)
Mesotype verberata (Scopoli, 1763)
Microloxia herbaria (Hübner, 1813)
Minoa murinata (Scopoli, 1763)
Nebula achromaria (de La Harpe, 1853)
Nebula nebulata (Treitschke, 1828)
Nebula senectaria (Herrich-Schäffer, 1852)
Nychiodes amygdalaria (Herrich-Schäffer, 1848)
Nychiodes dalmatina Wagner, 1909
Nycterosea obstipata (Fabricius, 1794)
Odezia atrata (Linnaeus, 1758)
Operophtera brumata (Linnaeus, 1758)
Opisthograptis luteolata (Linnaeus, 1758)
Orthostixis cribraria (Hübner, 1799)
Oulobophora internata (Pungeler, 1888)
Ourapteryx sambucaria (Linnaeus, 1758)
Paradarisa consonaria (Hübner, 1799)
Parectropis similaria (Hufnagel, 1767)
Pasiphila rectangulata (Linnaeus, 1758)
Pelurga comitata (Linnaeus, 1758)
Pennithera firmata (Hübner, 1822)
Pennithera ulicata (Rambur, 1934)
Perconia strigillaria (Hübner, 1787)
Peribatodes correptaria (Zeller, 1847)
Peribatodes rhomboidaria (Denis & Schiffermüller, 1775)
Peribatodes secundaria (Denis & Schiffermüller, 1775)
Peribatodes umbraria (Hübner, 1809)
Perizoma affinitata (Stephens, 1831)
Perizoma albulata (Denis & Schiffermüller, 1775)
Perizoma alchemillata (Linnaeus, 1758)
Perizoma blandiata (Denis & Schiffermüller, 1775)
Perizoma flavofasciata (Thunberg, 1792)
Perizoma flavosparsata (Wagner, 1926)
Perizoma hydrata (Treitschke, 1829)
Perizoma incultaria (Herrich-Schäffer, 1848)
Perizoma minorata (Treitschke, 1828)
Perizoma obsoletata (Herrich-Schäffer, 1838)
Phaiogramma etruscaria (Zeller, 1849)
Phibalapteryx virgata (Hufnagel, 1767)
Phigalia pilosaria (Denis & Schiffermüller, 1775)
Philereme vetulata (Denis & Schiffermüller, 1775)
Proteuchloris neriaria (Herrich-Schäffer, 1852)
Protorhoe corollaria (Herrich-Schäffer, 1848)
Protorhoe unicata (Guenee, 1858)
Pseudobaptria bogumilaria (Rebel, 1904)
Pseudopanthera macularia (Linnaeus, 1758)
Pseudoterpna pruinata (Hufnagel, 1767)
Pungeleria capreolaria (Denis & Schiffermüller, 1775)
Rhodometra sacraria (Linnaeus, 1767)
Rhodostrophia badiaria (Freyer, 1841)
Rhodostrophia calabra (Petagna, 1786)
Rhodostrophia discopunctata Amsel, 1935
Rhodostrophia vibicaria (Clerck, 1759)
Schistostege decussata (Denis & Schiffermüller, 1775)
Scopula beckeraria (Lederer, 1853)
Scopula confinaria (Herrich-Schäffer, 1847)
Scopula flaccidaria (Zeller, 1852)
Scopula imitaria (Hübner, 1799)
Scopula immutata (Linnaeus, 1758)
Scopula incanata (Linnaeus, 1758)
Scopula marginepunctata (Goeze, 1781)
Scopula decorata (Denis & Schiffermüller, 1775)
Scopula immorata (Linnaeus, 1758)
Scopula nigropunctata (Hufnagel, 1767)
Scopula ochraceata (Staudinger, 1901)
Scopula orientalis (Alphéraky, 1876)
Scopula ornata (Scopoli, 1763)
Scopula rubiginata (Hufnagel, 1767)
Scopula submutata (Treitschke, 1828)
Scopula tessellaria (Boisduval, 1840)
Scopula turbulentaria (Staudinger, 1870)
Scotopteryx bipunctaria (Denis & Schiffermüller, 1775)
Scotopteryx chenopodiata (Linnaeus, 1758)
Scotopteryx coarctaria (Denis & Schiffermüller, 1775)
Scotopteryx ignorata Huemer & Hausmann, 1998
Scotopteryx luridata (Hufnagel, 1767)
Scotopteryx moeniata (Scopoli, 1763)
Scotopteryx mucronata (Scopoli, 1763)
Scotopteryx vicinaria (Duponchel, 1830)
Selenia dentaria (Fabricius, 1775)
Selenia lunularia (Hübner, 1788)
Selenia tetralunaria (Hufnagel, 1767)
Selidosema plumaria (Denis & Schiffermüller, 1775)
Siona lineata (Scopoli, 1763)
Stegania dilectaria (Hübner, 1790)
Synopsia sociaria (Hübner, 1799)
Tephronia sepiaria (Hufnagel, 1767)
Thalera fimbrialis (Scopoli, 1763)
Thera cognata (Thunberg, 1792)
Thera juniperata (Linnaeus, 1758)
Thera variata (Denis & Schiffermüller, 1775)
Thera vetustata (Denis & Schiffermüller, 1775)
Thetidia smaragdaria (Fabricius, 1787)
Timandra comae Schmidt, 1931
Triphosa dubitata (Linnaeus, 1758)
Triphosa sabaudiata (Duponchel, 1830)
Xanthorhoe designata (Hufnagel, 1767)
Xanthorhoe ferrugata (Clerck, 1759)
Xanthorhoe fluctuata (Linnaeus, 1758)
Xanthorhoe montanata (Denis & Schiffermüller, 1775)
Xanthorhoe oxybiata (Milliere, 1872)
Xanthorhoe quadrifasiata (Clerck, 1759)
Xanthorhoe spadicearia (Denis & Schiffermüller, 1775)

Glyphipterigidae
Digitivalva heringi (Klimesch, 1956)
Digitivalva granitella (Treitschke, 1833)
Digitivalva macedonica (Klimesch, 1956)
Digitivalva orientella (Klimesch, 1956)
Digitivalva pulicariae (Klimesch, 1956)
Digitivalva wolfschlaegeri (Klimesch, 1956)

Gracillariidae
Acrocercops brongniardella (Fabricius, 1798)
Aspilapteryx limosella (Duponchel, 1843)
Aspilapteryx tringipennella (Zeller, 1839)
Caloptilia alchimiella (Scopoli, 1763)
Caloptilia fidella (Reutti, 1853)
Caloptilia fribergensis (Fritzsche, 1871)
Caloptilia honoratella (Rebel, 1914)
Caloptilia stigmatella (Fabricius, 1781)
Cameraria ohridella Deschka & Dimic, 1986
Cupedia cupediella (Herrich-Schäffer, 1855)
Euspilapteryx auroguttella Stephens, 1835
Parornix acuta Triberti, 1980
Parornix anglicella (Stainton, 1850)
Parornix anguliferella (Zeller, 1847)
Parornix carpinella (Frey, 1863)
Parornix fagivora (Frey, 1861)
Parornix torquillella (Zeller, 1850)
Phyllocnistis saligna (Zeller, 1839)
Phyllonorycter abrasella (Duponchel, 1843)
Phyllonorycter corylifoliella (Hübner, 1796)
Phyllonorycter delitella (Duponchel, 1843)
Phyllonorycter esperella (Goeze, 1783)
Phyllonorycter fiumella (Krone, 1910)
Phyllonorycter froelichiella (Zeller, 1839)
Phyllonorycter helianthemella (Herrich-Schäffer, 1861)
Phyllonorycter hostis Triberti, 2007
Phyllonorycter kuhlweiniella (Zeller, 1839)
Phyllonorycter macedonica (Deschka, 1971)
Phyllonorycter maestingella (Muller, 1764)
Phyllonorycter messaniella (Zeller, 1846)
Phyllonorycter millierella (Staudinger, 1871)
Phyllonorycter parisiella (Wocke, 1848)
Phyllonorycter pastorella (Zeller, 1846)
Phyllonorycter platani (Staudinger, 1870)
Phyllonorycter populifoliella (Treitschke, 1833)
Phyllonorycter quercifoliella (Zeller, 1839)
Phyllonorycter scitulella (Duponchel, 1843)
Phyllonorycter trifasciella (Haworth, 1828)
Phyllonorycter trojana Deschka, 1982
Phyllonorycter turanica (Gerasimov, 1931)

Heliozelidae
Antispila treitschkiella (Fischer von Röslerstamm, 1843)

Hepialidae
Hepialus humuli (Linnaeus, 1758)
Pharmacis fusconebulosa (DeGeer, 1778)
Pharmacis lupulina (Linnaeus, 1758)
Triodia adriaticus (Osthelder, 1931)
Triodia amasinus (Herrich-Schäffer, 1851)
Triodia sylvina (Linnaeus, 1761)

Heterogynidae
Heterogynis penella (Hübner, 1819)

Incurvariidae
Incurvaria masculella (Denis & Schiffermüller, 1775)
Incurvaria pectinea Haworth, 1828

Lasiocampidae
Cosmotriche lobulina (Denis & Schiffermüller, 1775)
Dendrolimus pini (Linnaeus, 1758)
Eriogaster catax (Linnaeus, 1758)
Eriogaster lanestris (Linnaeus, 1758)
Eriogaster rimicola (Denis & Schiffermüller, 1775)
Gastropacha quercifolia (Linnaeus, 1758)
Gastropacha populifolia (Denis & Schiffermüller, 1775)
Lasiocampa quercus (Linnaeus, 1758)
Lasiocampa grandis (Rogenhofer, 1891)
Lasiocampa trifolii (Denis & Schiffermüller, 1775)
Macrothylacia rubi (Linnaeus, 1758)
Malacosoma castrensis (Linnaeus, 1758)
Malacosoma neustria (Linnaeus, 1758)
Malacosoma franconica (Denis & Schiffermüller, 1775)
Odonestis pruni (Linnaeus, 1758)
Pachypasa otus (Drury, 1773)
Phyllodesma tremulifolia (Hübner, 1810)
Trichiura castiliana Spuler, 1908
Trichiura crataegi (Linnaeus, 1758)
Trichiura verenae Witt, 1981

Lecithoceridae
Homaloxestis briantiella (Turati, 1879)

Limacodidae
Apoda limacodes (Hufnagel, 1766)
Heterogenea asella (Denis & Schiffermüller, 1775)

Lyonetiidae
Leucoptera aceris (Fuchs, 1903)
Leucoptera heringiella Toll, 1938
Leucoptera laburnella (Stainton, 1851)
Leucoptera malifoliella (O. Costa, 1836)
Lyonetia clerkella (Linnaeus, 1758)
Lyonetia prunifoliella (Hübner, 1796)

Lypusidae
Pseudatemelia josephinae (Toll, 1956)

Micropterigidae
Micropterix corcyrella Walsingham, 1919
Micropterix kardamylensis Rebel, 1903
Micropterix myrtetella Zeller, 1850
Micropterix tunbergella (Fabricius, 1787)

Millieridae
Millieria dolosalis (Heydenreich, 1851)

Momphidae
Mompha miscella (Denis & Schiffermüller, 1775)
Mompha propinquella (Stainton, 1851)

Nepticulidae
Acalyptris platani (Muller-Rutz, 1934)
Ectoedemia caradjai (Groschke, 1944)
Ectoedemia gilvipennella (Klimesch, 1946)
Ectoedemia rufifrontella (Caradja, 1920)
Ectoedemia decentella (Herrich-Schäffer, 1855)
Ectoedemia eriki A. & Z. Lastuvka, 2000
Ectoedemia amani Svensson, 1966
Ectoedemia longicaudella Klimesch, 1953
Stigmella anomalella (Goeze, 1783)
Stigmella atricapitella (Haworth, 1828)
Stigmella crataegella (Klimesch, 1936)
Stigmella eberhardi (Johansson, 1971)
Stigmella johanssonella A. & Z. Lastuvka, 1997
Stigmella lonicerarum (Frey, 1856)
Stigmella microtheriella (Stainton, 1854)
Stigmella minusculella (Herrich-Schäffer, 1855)
Stigmella paliurella Gerasimov, 1937
Stigmella paradoxa (Frey, 1858)
Stigmella plagicolella (Stainton, 1854)
Stigmella prunetorum (Stainton, 1855)
Stigmella regiella (Herrich-Schäffer, 1855)
Stigmella roborella (Johansson, 1971)
Stigmella speciosa (Frey, 1858)
Stigmella tityrella (Stainton, 1854)
Stigmella trimaculella (Haworth, 1828)
Trifurcula bleonella (Chretien, 1904)
Trifurcula globulariae Klimesch, 1975
Trifurcula cryptella (Stainton, 1856)
Trifurcula eurema (Tutt, 1899)
Trifurcula calycotomella A. & Z. Lastuvka, 1997
Trifurcula macedonica Z. & A. Lastuvka, 1998
Trifurcula orientella Klimesch, 1953
Trifurcula pallidella (Duponchel, 1843)

Noctuidae
Abrostola agnorista Dufay, 1956
Abrostola asclepiadis (Denis & Schiffermüller, 1775)
Abrostola tripartita (Hufnagel, 1766)
Abrostola triplasia (Linnaeus, 1758)
Acontia lucida (Hufnagel, 1766)
Acontia trabealis (Scopoli, 1763)
Acontia melanura (Tauscher, 1809)
Acontiola moldavicola (Herrich-Schäffer, 1851)
Acosmetia caliginosa (Hübner, 1813)
Acronicta aceris (Linnaeus, 1758)
Acronicta leporina (Linnaeus, 1758)
Acronicta strigosa (Denis & Schiffermüller, 1775)
Acronicta alni (Linnaeus, 1767)
Acronicta cuspis (Hübner, 1813)
Acronicta psi (Linnaeus, 1758)
Acronicta tridens (Denis & Schiffermüller, 1775)
Acronicta auricoma (Denis & Schiffermüller, 1775)
Acronicta euphorbiae (Denis & Schiffermüller, 1775)
Acronicta orientalis (Mann, 1862)
Acronicta rumicis (Linnaeus, 1758)
Actebia praecox (Linnaeus, 1758)
Actinotia polyodon (Clerck, 1759)
Actinotia radiosa (Esper, 1804)
Aedia funesta (Esper, 1786)
Aedia leucomelas (Linnaeus, 1758)
Aegle kaekeritziana (Hübner, 1799)
Aegle semicana (Esper, 1798)
Agrochola lychnidis (Denis & Schiffermüller, 1775)
Agrochola lactiflora Draudt, 1934
Agrochola helvola (Linnaeus, 1758)
Agrochola humilis (Denis & Schiffermüller, 1775)
Agrochola kindermannii (Fischer v. Röslerstamm, 1837)
Agrochola litura (Linnaeus, 1758)
Agrochola nitida (Denis & Schiffermüller, 1775)
Agrochola thurneri Boursin, 1953
Agrochola lota (Clerck, 1759)
Agrochola macilenta (Hübner, 1809)
Agrochola laevis (Hübner, 1803)
Agrotis bigramma (Esper, 1790)
Agrotis cinerea (Denis & Schiffermüller, 1775)
Agrotis clavis (Hufnagel, 1766)
Agrotis exclamationis (Linnaeus, 1758)
Agrotis ipsilon (Hufnagel, 1766)
Agrotis obesa Boisduval, 1829
Agrotis puta (Hübner, 1803)
Agrotis segetum (Denis & Schiffermüller, 1775)
Agrotis spinifera (Hübner, 1808)
Agrotis trux (Hübner, 1824)
Allophyes oxyacanthae (Linnaeus, 1758)
Amephana dalmatica (Rebel, 1919)
Ammoconia caecimacula (Denis & Schiffermüller, 1775)
Ammoconia senex (Geyer, 1828)
Amphipoea fucosa (Freyer, 1830)
Amphipoea oculea (Linnaeus, 1761)
Amphipyra berbera Rungs, 1949
Amphipyra effusa Boisduval, 1828
Amphipyra livida (Denis & Schiffermüller, 1775)
Amphipyra micans Lederer, 1857
Amphipyra perflua (Fabricius, 1787)
Amphipyra pyramidea (Linnaeus, 1758)
Amphipyra stix Herrich-Schäffer, 1850
Amphipyra tetra (Fabricius, 1787)
Amphipyra tragopoginis (Clerck, 1759)
Amphipyra cinnamomea (Goeze, 1781)
Anaplectoides prasina (Denis & Schiffermüller, 1775)
Anarta dianthi (Tauscher, 1809)
Anarta melanopa (Thunberg, 1791)
Anarta mendax (Staudinger, 1879)
Anarta odontites (Boisduval, 1829)
Anarta trifolii (Hufnagel, 1766)
Anorthoa munda (Denis & Schiffermüller, 1775)
Anthracia eriopoda (Herrich-Schäffer, 1851)
Antitype chi (Linnaeus, 1758)
Antitype jonis (Lederer, 1865)
Antitype suda (Geyer, 1832)
Apamea anceps (Denis & Schiffermüller, 1775)
Apamea aquila Donzel, 1837
Apamea crenata (Hufnagel, 1766)
Apamea epomidion (Haworth, 1809)
Apamea furva (Denis & Schiffermüller, 1775)
Apamea illyria Freyer, 1846
Apamea lateritia (Hufnagel, 1766)
Apamea lithoxylaea (Denis & Schiffermüller, 1775)
Apamea maillardi (Geyer, 1834)
Apamea michielii Varga, 1976
Apamea monoglypha (Hufnagel, 1766)
Apamea oblonga (Haworth, 1809)
Apamea platinea (Treitschke, 1825)
Apamea remissa (Hübner, 1809)
Apamea rubrirena (Treitschke, 1825)
Apamea scolopacina (Esper, 1788)
Apamea sordens (Hufnagel, 1766)
Apamea sublustris (Esper, 1788)
Apamea syriaca (Osthelder, 1933)
Apamea unanimis (Hübner, 1813)
Apamea zeta (Treitschke, 1825)
Apaustis rupicola (Denis & Schiffermüller, 1775)
Aporophyla australis (Boisduval, 1829)
Aporophyla canescens (Duponchel, 1826)
Aporophyla lutulenta (Denis & Schiffermüller, 1775)
Aporophyla nigra (Haworth, 1809)
Apterogenum ypsillon (Denis & Schiffermüller, 1775)
Archanara neurica (Hübner, 1808)
Asteroscopus sphinx (Hufnagel, 1766)
Asteroscopus syriaca (Warren, 1910)
Atethmia ambusta (Denis & Schiffermüller, 1775)
Atethmia centrago (Haworth, 1809)
Athetis furvula (Hübner, 1808)
Athetis gluteosa (Treitschke, 1835)
Athetis pallustris (Hübner, 1808)
Athetis lepigone (Moschler, 1860)
Atypha pulmonaris (Esper, 1790)
Auchmis detersa (Esper, 1787)
Autographa gamma (Linnaeus, 1758)
Autographa jota (Linnaeus, 1758)
Autographa pulchrina (Haworth, 1809)
Axylia putris (Linnaeus, 1761)
Behounekia freyeri (Frivaldszky, 1835)
Brachionycha nubeculosa (Esper, 1785)
Brachylomia viminalis (Fabricius, 1776)
Bryophila ereptricula Treitschke, 1825
Bryophila orthogramma (Boursin, 1954)
Bryophila raptricula (Denis & Schiffermüller, 1775)
Bryophila ravula (Hübner, 1813)
Bryophila rectilinea (Warren, 1909)
Bryophila seladona Christoph, 1885
Bryophila tephrocharis (Boursin, 1953)
Bryophila domestica (Hufnagel, 1766)
Calamia tridens (Hufnagel, 1766)
Calliergis ramosa (Esper, 1786)
Callopistria juventina (Stoll, 1782)
Callopistria latreillei (Duponchel, 1827)
Calophasia lunula (Hufnagel, 1766)
Calophasia opalina (Esper, 1793)
Calophasia platyptera (Esper, 1788)
Caradrina morpheus (Hufnagel, 1766)
Caradrina gilva (Donzel, 1837)
Caradrina abruzzensis (Draudt, 1933)
Caradrina clavipalpis Scopoli, 1763
Caradrina flavirena Guenee, 1852
Caradrina selini Boisduval, 1840
Caradrina suscianja (Mentzer, 1981)
Caradrina wullschlegeli Pungeler, 1903
Caradrina aspersa Rambur, 1834
Caradrina kadenii Freyer, 1836
Caradrina terrea Freyer, 1840
Ceramica pisi (Linnaeus, 1758)
Cerapteryx graminis (Linnaeus, 1758)
Cerastis leucographa (Denis & Schiffermüller, 1775)
Cerastis rubricosa (Denis & Schiffermüller, 1775)
Charanyca trigrammica (Hufnagel, 1766)
Charanyca apfelbecki (Rebel, 1901)
Charanyca ferruginea (Esper, 1785)
Chersotis cuprea (Denis & Schiffermüller, 1775)
Chersotis fimbriola (Esper, 1803)
Chersotis laeta (Rebel, 1904)
Chersotis margaritacea (Villers, 1789)
Chersotis multangula (Hübner, 1803)
Chilodes maritima (Tauscher, 1806)
Chloantha hyperici (Denis & Schiffermüller, 1775)
Chrysodeixis chalcites (Esper, 1789)
Cleoceris scoriacea (Esper, 1789)
Cleonymia opposita (Lederer, 1870)
Colocasia coryli (Linnaeus, 1758)
Condica viscosa (Freyer, 1831)
Conisania luteago (Denis & Schiffermüller, 1775)
Conistra ligula (Esper, 1791)
Conistra rubiginosa (Scopoli, 1763)
Conistra vaccinii (Linnaeus, 1761)
Conistra veronicae (Hübner, 1813)
Conistra erythrocephala (Denis & Schiffermüller, 1775)
Conistra rubiginea (Denis & Schiffermüller, 1775)
Conistra ragusae (Failla-Tedaldi, 1890)
Conistra torrida (Lederer, 1857)
Coranarta cordigera (Thunberg, 1788)
Cosmia trapezina (Linnaeus, 1758)
Cosmia pyralina (Denis & Schiffermüller, 1775)
Cosmia confinis Herrich-Schäffer, 1849
Cosmia affinis (Linnaeus, 1767)
Craniophora ligustri (Denis & Schiffermüller, 1775)
Craniophora pontica (Staudinger, 1878)
Cryphia fraudatricula (Hübner, 1803)
Cryphia receptricula (Hübner, 1803)
Cryphia algae (Fabricius, 1775)
Cryphia ochsi (Boursin, 1940)
Crypsedra gemmea (Treitschke, 1825)
Cucullia celsiae Herrich-Schäffer, 1850
Cucullia absinthii (Linnaeus, 1761)
Cucullia argentea (Hufnagel, 1766)
Cucullia artemisiae (Hufnagel, 1766)
Cucullia asteris (Denis & Schiffermüller, 1775)
Cucullia balsamitae Boisduval, 1840
Cucullia campanulae Freyer, 1831
Cucullia chamomillae (Denis & Schiffermüller, 1775)
Cucullia formosa Rogenhofer, 1860
Cucullia fraudatrix Eversmann, 1837
Cucullia lactucae (Denis & Schiffermüller, 1775)
Cucullia lucifuga (Denis & Schiffermüller, 1775)
Cucullia santonici (Hübner, 1813)
Cucullia scopariae Dorfmeister, 1853
Cucullia tanaceti (Denis & Schiffermüller, 1775)
Cucullia umbratica (Linnaeus, 1758)
Cucullia xeranthemi Boisduval, 1840
Cucullia blattariae (Esper, 1790)
Cucullia lanceolata (Villers, 1789)
Cucullia lychnitis Rambur, 1833
Cucullia prenanthis Boisduval, 1840
Cucullia scrophulariae (Denis & Schiffermüller, 1775)
Cucullia verbasci (Linnaeus, 1758)
Dasypolia ferdinandi Ruhl, 1892
Dasypolia templi (Thunberg, 1792)
Deltote bankiana (Fabricius, 1775)
Deltote deceptoria (Scopoli, 1763)
Deltote uncula (Clerck, 1759)
Deltote pygarga (Hufnagel, 1766)
Denticucullus pygmina (Haworth, 1809)
Diachrysia chrysitis (Linnaeus, 1758)
Diachrysia chryson (Esper, 1789)
Diachrysia nadeja (Oberthur, 1880)
Diachrysia zosimi (Hübner, 1822)
Diarsia mendica (Fabricius, 1775)
Diarsia rubi (Vieweg, 1790)
Dichagyris flammatra (Denis & Schiffermüller, 1775)
Dichagyris candelisequa (Denis & Schiffermüller, 1775)
Dichagyris flavina (Herrich-Schäffer, 1852)
Dichagyris forcipula (Denis & Schiffermüller, 1775)
Dichagyris nigrescens (Hofner, 1888)
Dichagyris orientis (Alphéraky, 1882)
Dichagyris renigera (Hübner, 1808)
Dichagyris signifera (Denis & Schiffermüller, 1775)
Dichonia aeruginea (Hübner, 1808)
Dichonia convergens (Denis & Schiffermüller, 1775)
Dicycla oo (Linnaeus, 1758)
Diloba caeruleocephala (Linnaeus, 1758)
Dioszeghyana schmidti (Dioszeghy, 1935)
Divaena haywardi (Tams, 1926)
Dryobota labecula (Esper, 1788)
Dryobotodes tenebrosa (Esper, 1789)
Dryobotodes carbonis Wagner, 1931
Dryobotodes eremita (Fabricius, 1775)
Dryobotodes monochroma (Esper, 1790)
Dypterygia scabriuscula (Linnaeus, 1758)
Egira conspicillaris (Linnaeus, 1758)
Elaphria venustula (Hübner, 1790)
Enargia abluta (Hübner, 1808)
Enterpia laudeti (Boisduval, 1840)
Epilecta linogrisea (Denis & Schiffermüller, 1775)
Epimecia ustula (Freyer, 1835)
Epipsilia grisescens (Fabricius, 1794)
Episema glaucina (Esper, 1789)
Episema korsakovi (Christoph, 1885)
Episema lederi Christoph, 1885
Episema tersa (Denis & Schiffermüller, 1775)
Eremobia ochroleuca (Denis & Schiffermüller, 1775)
Eucarta amethystina (Hübner, 1803)
Eucarta virgo (Treitschke, 1835)
Euchalcia consona (Fabricius, 1787)
Euchalcia modestoides Poole, 1989
Eugnorisma depuncta (Linnaeus, 1761)
Eugnorisma pontica (Staudinger, 1892)
Euplexia lucipara (Linnaeus, 1758)
Eupsilia transversa (Hufnagel, 1766)
Euxoa aquilina (Denis & Schiffermüller, 1775)
Euxoa conspicua (Hübner, 1824)
Euxoa cos (Hübner, 1824)
Euxoa decora (Denis & Schiffermüller, 1775)
Euxoa distinguenda (Lederer, 1857)
Euxoa eruta (Hübner, 1817)
Euxoa glabella Wagner, 1930
Euxoa hastifera (Donzel, 1847)
Euxoa nigricans (Linnaeus, 1761)
Euxoa nigrofusca (Esper, 1788)
Euxoa obelisca (Denis & Schiffermüller, 1775)
Euxoa temera (Hübner, 1808)
Euxoa vitta (Esper, 1789)
Evisa schawerdae Reisser, 1930
Globia algae (Esper, 1789)
Gortyna borelii Pierret, 1837
Gortyna flavago (Denis & Schiffermüller, 1775)
Gortyna puengeleri (Turati, 1909)
Graphiphora augur (Fabricius, 1775)
Griposia aprilina (Linnaeus, 1758)
Hada plebeja (Linnaeus, 1761)
Hadena irregularis (Hufnagel, 1766)
Hadena perplexa (Denis & Schiffermüller, 1775)
Hadena silenes (Hübner, 1822)
Hadena syriaca (Osthelder, 1933)
Hadena adriana (Schawerda, 1921)
Hadena albimacula (Borkhausen, 1792)
Hadena caesia (Denis & Schiffermüller, 1775)
Hadena capsincola (Denis & Schiffermüller, 1775)
Hadena clara (Staudinger, 1901)
Hadena compta (Denis & Schiffermüller, 1775)
Hadena confusa (Hufnagel, 1766)
Hadena drenowskii (Rebel, 1930)
Hadena filograna (Esper, 1788)
Hadena gueneei (Staudinger, 1901)
Hadena luteocincta (Rambur, 1834)
Hadena magnolii (Boisduval, 1829)
Hadena perpetua Hacker, 1996
Hadena vulcanica (Turati, 1907)
Hadena wehrlii (Draudt, 1934)
Haemerosia renalis (Hübner, 1813)
Hecatera bicolorata (Hufnagel, 1766)
Hecatera cappa (Hübner, 1809)
Hecatera dysodea (Denis & Schiffermüller, 1775)
Helicoverpa armigera (Hübner, 1808)
Heliothis adaucta Butler, 1878
Heliothis incarnata Freyer, 1838
Heliothis maritima Graslin, 1855
Heliothis nubigera Herrich-Schäffer, 1851
Heliothis ononis (Denis & Schiffermüller, 1775)
Heliothis peltigera (Denis & Schiffermüller, 1775)
Heliothis viriplaca (Hufnagel, 1766)
Helivictoria victorina (Sodoffsky, 1849)
Hoplodrina ambigua (Denis & Schiffermüller, 1775)
Hoplodrina blanda (Denis & Schiffermüller, 1775)
Hoplodrina octogenaria (Goeze, 1781)
Hoplodrina respersa (Denis & Schiffermüller, 1775)
Hoplodrina superstes (Ochsenheimer, 1816)
Hydraecia micacea (Esper, 1789)
Hydraecia petasitis Doubleday, 1847
Hyppa rectilinea (Esper, 1788)
Ipimorpha retusa (Linnaeus, 1761)
Ipimorpha subtusa (Denis & Schiffermüller, 1775)
Janthinea friwaldskii (Duponchel, 1835)
Jodia croceago (Denis & Schiffermüller, 1775)
Lacanobia contigua (Denis & Schiffermüller, 1775)
Lacanobia suasa (Denis & Schiffermüller, 1775)
Lacanobia thalassina (Hufnagel, 1766)
Lacanobia aliena (Hübner, 1809)
Lacanobia blenna (Hübner, 1824)
Lacanobia oleracea (Linnaeus, 1758)
Lacanobia splendens (Hübner, 1808)
Lacanobia w-latinum (Hufnagel, 1766)
Lamprotes c-aureum (Knoch, 1781)
Lasionycta proxima (Hübner, 1809)
Lateroligia ophiogramma (Esper, 1794)
Lenisa geminipuncta (Haworth, 1809)
Leucania loreyi (Duponchel, 1827)
Leucania comma (Linnaeus, 1761)
Leucania obsoleta (Hübner, 1803)
Leucania punctosa (Treitschke, 1825)
Leucania putrescens (Hübner, 1824)
Leucania zeae (Duponchel, 1827)
Lithophane furcifera (Hufnagel, 1766)
Lithophane ledereri (Staudinger, 1892)
Lithophane merckii (Rambur, 1832)
Lithophane ornitopus (Hufnagel, 1766)
Lithophane semibrunnea (Haworth, 1809)
Lithophane socia (Hufnagel, 1766)
Lithophane lapidea (Hübner, 1808)
Litoligia literosa (Haworth, 1809)
Luperina dumerilii (Duponchel, 1826)
Luperina nickerlii (Freyer, 1845)
Luperina rubella (Duponchel, 1835)
Luperina testacea (Denis & Schiffermüller, 1775)
Macdunnoughia confusa (Stephens, 1850)
Mamestra brassicae (Linnaeus, 1758)
Maraschia grisescens Osthelder, 1933
Meganephria bimaculosa (Linnaeus, 1767)
Mesapamea secalella Remm, 1983
Mesapamea secalis (Linnaeus, 1758)
Mesogona acetosellae (Denis & Schiffermüller, 1775)
Mesoligia furuncula (Denis & Schiffermüller, 1775)
Mesotrosta signalis (Treitschke, 1829)
Mniotype adusta (Esper, 1790)
Mniotype satura (Denis & Schiffermüller, 1775)
Mniotype solieri (Boisduval, 1829)
Moma alpium (Osbeck, 1778)
Mormo maura (Linnaeus, 1758)
Mythimna riparia (Rambur, 1829)
Mythimna albipuncta (Denis & Schiffermüller, 1775)
Mythimna congrua (Hübner, 1817)
Mythimna ferrago (Fabricius, 1787)
Mythimna l-album (Linnaeus, 1767)
Mythimna conigera (Denis & Schiffermüller, 1775)
Mythimna impura (Hübner, 1808)
Mythimna pallens (Linnaeus, 1758)
Mythimna pudorina (Denis & Schiffermüller, 1775)
Mythimna straminea (Treitschke, 1825)
Mythimna turca (Linnaeus, 1761)
Mythimna vitellina (Hübner, 1808)
Mythimna alopecuri (Boisduval, 1840)
Mythimna andereggii (Boisduval, 1840)
Mythimna sicula (Treitschke, 1835)
Naenia typica (Linnaeus, 1758)
Noctua comes Hübner, 1813
Noctua fimbriata (Schreber, 1759)
Noctua interposita (Hübner, 1790)
Noctua janthina Denis & Schiffermüller, 1775
Noctua orbona (Hufnagel, 1766)
Noctua pronuba (Linnaeus, 1758)
Noctua tirrenica Biebinger, Speidel & Hanigk, 1983
Nyctobrya amasina Draudt, 1931
Nyctobrya muralis (Forster, 1771)
Ochropleura leucogaster (Freyer, 1831)
Ochropleura plecta (Linnaeus, 1761)
Oligia fasciuncula (Haworth, 1809)
Oligia latruncula (Denis & Schiffermüller, 1775)
Oligia strigilis (Linnaeus, 1758)
Oligia versicolor (Borkhausen, 1792)
Olivenebula subsericata (Herrich-Schäffer, 1861)
Omia cymbalariae (Hübner, 1809)
Omphalophana anatolica (Lederer, 1857)
Omphalophana antirrhinii (Hübner, 1803)
Opigena polygona (Denis & Schiffermüller, 1775)
Oria musculosa (Hübner, 1808)
Orthosia gracilis (Denis & Schiffermüller, 1775)
Orthosia opima (Hübner, 1809)
Orthosia cerasi (Fabricius, 1775)
Orthosia cruda (Denis & Schiffermüller, 1775)
Orthosia dalmatica (Wagner, 1909)
Orthosia miniosa (Denis & Schiffermüller, 1775)
Orthosia populeti (Fabricius, 1775)
Orthosia incerta (Hufnagel, 1766)
Orthosia gothica (Linnaeus, 1758)
Oxicesta chamoenices (Herrich-Schäffer, 1845)
Oxicesta geographica (Fabricius, 1787)
Oxytripia orbiculosa (Esper, 1799)
Pachetra sagittigera (Hufnagel, 1766)
Panchrysia aurea (Hübner, 1803)
Panchrysia v-argenteum (Esper, 1798)
Panemeria tenebrata (Scopoli, 1763)
Panolis flammea (Denis & Schiffermüller, 1775)
Papestra biren (Goeze, 1781)
Parastichtis suspecta (Hübner, 1817)
Peridroma saucia (Hübner, 1808)
Perigrapha i-cinctum (Denis & Schiffermüller, 1775)
Perigrapha rorida Frivaldszky, 1835
Periphanes delphinii (Linnaeus, 1758)
Philareta treitschkei (Frivaldszky, 1835)
Phlogophora meticulosa (Linnaeus, 1758)
Phlogophora scita (Hübner, 1790)
Photedes captiuncula (Treitschke, 1825)
Photedes extrema (Hübner, 1809)
Photedes minima (Haworth, 1809)
Photedes morrisii (Dale, 1837)
Phyllophila obliterata (Rambur, 1833)
Plusidia cheiranthi (Tauscher, 1809)
Polia bombycina (Hufnagel, 1766)
Polia nebulosa (Hufnagel, 1766)
Polia serratilinea Ochsenheimer, 1816
Polychrysia moneta (Fabricius, 1787)
Polymixis culoti (Schawerda, 1921)
Polymixis leuconota (Frivaldszky, 1841)
Polymixis flavicincta (Denis & Schiffermüller, 1775)
Polymixis polymita (Linnaeus, 1761)
Polymixis rufocincta (Geyer, 1828)
Polymixis serpentina (Treitschke, 1825)
Polyphaenis sericata (Esper, 1787)
Praestilbia armeniaca Staudinger, 1892
Protoschinia scutosa (Denis & Schiffermüller, 1775)
Pseudeustrotia candidula (Denis & Schiffermüller, 1775)
Pseudluperina pozzii (Curo, 1883)
Pyrrhia purpura (Hübner, 1817)
Pyrrhia umbra (Hufnagel, 1766)
Rhizedra lutosa (Hübner, 1803)
Rhyacia lucipeta (Denis & Schiffermüller, 1775)
Rhyacia simulans (Hufnagel, 1766)
Rileyiana fovea (Treitschke, 1825)
Schinia cardui (Hübner, 1790)
Schinia cognata (Freyer, 1833)
Scotochrosta pulla (Denis & Schiffermüller, 1775)
Sesamia cretica Lederer, 1857
Sesamia nonagrioides Lefebvre, 1827
Sideridis rivularis (Fabricius, 1775)
Sideridis implexa (Hübner, 1809)
Sideridis kitti (Schawerda, 1914)
Sideridis reticulata (Goeze, 1781)
Sideridis lampra (Schawerda, 1913)
Sideridis turbida (Esper, 1790)
Simyra albovenosa (Goeze, 1781)
Simyra dentinosa Freyer, 1838
Simyra nervosa (Denis & Schiffermüller, 1775)
Spaelotis ravida (Denis & Schiffermüller, 1775)
Spaelotis senna (Freyer, 1829)
Spodoptera exigua (Hübner, 1808)
Standfussiana lucernea (Linnaeus, 1758)
Stenoecia dos (Freyer, 1838)
Subacronicta megacephala (Denis & Schiffermüller, 1775)
Syngrapha devergens (Hübner, 1813)
Synthymia fixa (Fabricius, 1787)
Teinoptera lunaki (Boursin, 1940)
Teinoptera olivina (Herrich-Schäffer, 1852)
Thalpophila matura (Hufnagel, 1766)
Tholera cespitis (Denis & Schiffermüller, 1775)
Tholera decimalis (Poda, 1761)
Thysanoplusia orichalcea (Fabricius, 1775)
Tiliacea aurago (Denis & Schiffermüller, 1775)
Tiliacea citrago (Linnaeus, 1758)
Tiliacea cypreago (Hampson, 1906)
Tiliacea sulphurago (Denis & Schiffermüller, 1775)
Trachea atriplicis (Linnaeus, 1758)
Trichoplusia ni (Hübner, 1803)
Trigonophora flammea (Esper, 1785)
Tyta luctuosa (Denis & Schiffermüller, 1775)
Ulochlaena hirta (Hübner, 1813)
Valeria jaspidea (Villers, 1789)
Valeria oleagina (Denis & Schiffermüller, 1775)
Xanthia gilvago (Denis & Schiffermüller, 1775)
Xanthia icteritia (Hufnagel, 1766)
Xanthia ocellaris (Borkhausen, 1792)
Xanthia ruticilla (Esper, 1791)
Xanthia togata (Esper, 1788)
Xestia ashworthii (Doubleday, 1855)
Xestia c-nigrum (Linnaeus, 1758)
Xestia ditrapezium (Denis & Schiffermüller, 1775)
Xestia baja (Denis & Schiffermüller, 1775)
Xestia castanea (Esper, 1798)
Xestia ochreago (Hübner, 1809)
Xestia stigmatica (Hübner, 1813)
Xestia xanthographa (Denis & Schiffermüller, 1775)
Xylena exsoleta (Linnaeus, 1758)
Xylena lunifera Warren, 1910
Xylena vetusta (Hübner, 1813)

Nolidae
Bena bicolorana (Fuessly, 1775)
Earias clorana (Linnaeus, 1761)
Earias vernana (Fabricius, 1787)
Meganola albula (Denis & Schiffermüller, 1775)
Meganola strigula (Denis & Schiffermüller, 1775)
Meganola togatulalis (Hübner, 1796)
Nola confusalis (Herrich-Schäffer, 1847)
Nola cucullatella (Linnaeus, 1758)
Nola subchlamydula Staudinger, 1871
Nycteola asiatica (Krulikovsky, 1904)
Nycteola columbana (Turner, 1925)
Nycteola revayana (Scopoli, 1772)
Nycteola siculana (Fuchs, 1899)
Pseudoips prasinana (Linnaeus, 1758)

Notodontidae
Cerura vinula (Linnaeus, 1758)
Clostera anachoreta (Denis & Schiffermüller, 1775)
Clostera anastomosis (Linnaeus, 1758)
Clostera curtula (Linnaeus, 1758)
Clostera pigra (Hufnagel, 1766)
Dicranura ulmi (Denis & Schiffermüller, 1775)
Drymonia dodonaea (Denis & Schiffermüller, 1775)
Drymonia obliterata (Esper, 1785)
Drymonia querna (Denis & Schiffermüller, 1775)
Drymonia ruficornis (Hufnagel, 1766)
Furcula bifida (Brahm, 1787)
Furcula furcula (Clerck, 1759)
Harpyia milhauseri (Fabricius, 1775)
Notodonta dromedarius (Linnaeus, 1767)
Notodonta ziczac (Linnaeus, 1758)
Paradrymonia vittata (Staudinger, 1892)
Peridea anceps (Goeze, 1781)
Peridea korbi (Rebel, 1918)
Phalera bucephala (Linnaeus, 1758)
Phalera bucephaloides (Ochsenheimer, 1810)
Pterostoma palpina (Clerck, 1759)
Ptilodon capucina (Linnaeus, 1758)
Spatalia argentina (Denis & Schiffermüller, 1775)
Stauropus fagi (Linnaeus, 1758)
Thaumetopoea processionea (Linnaeus, 1758)
Thaumetopoea solitaria (Freyer, 1838)

Oecophoridae
Alabonia staintoniella (Zeller, 1850)
Aplota nigricans (Zeller, 1852)
Batia internella Jackh, 1972
Batia lambdella (Donovan, 1793)
Batia lunaris (Haworth, 1828)
Crassa unitella (Hübner, 1796)
Dasycera oliviella (Fabricius, 1794)
Denisia augustella (Hübner, 1796)
Epicallima formosella (Denis & Schiffermüller, 1775)
Fabiola pokornyi (Nickerl, 1864)
Harpella forficella (Scopoli, 1763)
Holoscolia huebneri Kocak, 1980
Metalampra cinnamomea (Zeller, 1839)
Oecophora bractella (Linnaeus, 1758)
Pleurota aristella (Linnaeus, 1767)
Pleurota filigerella Mann, 1867
Pleurota nitens Staudinger, 1870
Pleurota planella (Staudinger, 1859)
Pleurota proteella Staudinger, 1880
Pleurota pungitiella Herrich-Schäffer, 1854
Pleurota pyropella (Denis & Schiffermüller, 1775)
Pleurota vittalba Staudinger, 1871
Schiffermuelleria schaefferella (Linnaeus, 1758)

Opostegidae
Opostega salaciella (Treitschke, 1833)
Opostega spatulella Herrich-Schäffer, 1855
Pseudopostega crepusculella (Zeller, 1839)

Peleopodidae
Carcina quercana (Fabricius, 1775)

Plutellidae
Eidophasia messingiella (Fischer von Röslerstamm, 1840)
Eidophasia syenitella Herrich-Schäffer, 1854
Plutella xylostella (Linnaeus, 1758)
Rhigognostis hufnagelii (Zeller, 1839)
Rhigognostis wolfschlaegeri (Rebel, 1940)

Praydidae
Atemelia torquatella (Lienig & Zeller, 1846)
Prays oleae (Bernard, 1788)

Psychidae
Acanthopsyche zelleri (Mann, 1855)
Bijugis bombycella (Denis & Schiffermüller, 1775)
Canephora hirsuta (Poda, 1761)
Dahlica triquetrella (Hübner, 1813)
Eochorica balcanica (Rebel, 1919)
Eumasia parietariella (Heydenreich, 1851)
Heliopsychidea graecella (Milliere, 1866)
Megalophanes viciella (Denis & Schiffermüller, 1775)
Oiketicoides lutea (Staudinger, 1870)
Penestoglossa dardoinella (Milliere, 1863)
Phalacropterix praecellens (Staudinger, 1870)
Pseudobankesia macedoniella (Rebel, 1919)
Psyche casta (Pallas, 1767)
Psyche crassiorella Bruand, 1851
Psychidea balcanica (Wehrli, 1933)
Rebelia macedonica Pinker, 1956
Rebelia sapho (Milliere, 1864)
Reisseronia pusilella (Rebel, 1941)
Taleporia tubulosa (Retzius, 1783)
Typhonia ciliaris (Ochsenheimer, 1810)

Pterophoridae
Agdistis adactyla (Hübner, 1819)
Agdistis tamaricis (Zeller, 1847)
Amblyptilia acanthadactyla (Hübner, 1813)
Buszkoiana capnodactylus (Zeller, 1841)
Calyciphora albodactylus (Fabricius, 1794)
Calyciphora nephelodactyla (Eversmann, 1844)
Calyciphora xanthodactyla (Treitschke, 1833)
Capperia celeusi (Frey, 1886)
Capperia fusca (O. Hofmann, 1898)
Capperia hellenica Adamczewski, 1951
Capperia maratonica Adamczewski, 1951
Capperia trichodactyla (Denis & Schiffermüller, 1775)
Cnaemidophorus rhododactyla (Denis & Schiffermüller, 1775)
Crombrugghia distans (Zeller, 1847)
Crombrugghia laetus (Zeller, 1847)
Crombrugghia tristis (Zeller, 1841)
Emmelina monodactyla (Linnaeus, 1758)
Gillmeria miantodactylus (Zeller, 1841)
Gillmeria ochrodactyla (Denis & Schiffermüller, 1775)
Hellinsia carphodactyla (Hübner, 1813)
Hellinsia inulae (Zeller, 1852)
Hellinsia tephradactyla (Hübner, 1813)
Merrifieldia baliodactylus (Zeller, 1841)
Merrifieldia leucodactyla (Denis & Schiffermüller, 1775)
Merrifieldia malacodactylus (Zeller, 1847)
Merrifieldia tridactyla (Linnaeus, 1758)
Oidaematophorus constanti Ragonot, 1875
Oxyptilus ericetorum (Stainton, 1851)
Oxyptilus parvidactyla (Haworth, 1811)
Oxyptilus pilosellae (Zeller, 1841)
Paraplatyptilia metzneri (Zeller, 1841)
Platyptilia calodactyla (Denis & Schiffermüller, 1775)
Platyptilia farfarellus Zeller, 1867
Platyptilia nemoralis Zeller, 1841
Platyptilia tesseradactyla (Linnaeus, 1761)
Pterophorus ischnodactyla (Treitschke, 1835)
Pterophorus pentadactyla (Linnaeus, 1758)
Stangeia siceliota (Zeller, 1847)
Stenoptilia bipunctidactyla (Scopoli, 1763)
Stenoptilia graphodactyla (Treitschke, 1833)
Stenoptilia lutescens (Herrich-Schäffer, 1855)
Stenoptilia mannii (Zeller, 1852)
Stenoptilia pelidnodactyla (Stein, 1837)
Stenoptilia pterodactyla (Linnaeus, 1761)
Stenoptilia zophodactylus (Duponchel, 1840)
Wheeleria ivae (Kasy, 1960)
Wheeleria obsoletus (Zeller, 1841)

Pyralidae
Achroia grisella (Fabricius, 1794)
Acrobasis advenella (Zincken, 1818)
Acrobasis consociella (Hübner, 1813)
Acrobasis dulcella (Zeller, 1848)
Acrobasis glaucella Staudinger, 1859
Acrobasis legatea (Haworth, 1811)
Acrobasis marmorea (Haworth, 1811)
Acrobasis obtusella (Hübner, 1796)
Acrobasis sodalella Zeller, 1848
Acrobasis suavella (Zincken, 1818)
Acrobasis tumidana (Denis & Schiffermüller, 1775)
Aglossa caprealis (Hübner, 1809)
Aglossa pinguinalis (Linnaeus, 1758)
Aglossa signicostalis Staudinger, 1871
Alophia combustella (Herrich-Schäffer, 1855)
Ancylosis cinnamomella (Duponchel, 1836)
Ancylosis gracilella Ragonot, 1887
Ancylosis hellenica (Staudinger, 1871)
Ancylosis muliebris (Meyrick, 1937)
Ancylosis oblitella (Zeller, 1848)
Ancylosis roscidella (Eversmann, 1844)
Aphomia sociella (Linnaeus, 1758)
Aphomia zelleri de Joannis, 1932
Apomyelois ceratoniae (Zeller, 1839)
Asalebria florella (Mann, 1862)
Asarta aethiopella (Duponchel, 1837)
Bostra obsoletalis (Mann, 1884)
Bradyrrhoa confiniella Zeller, 1848
Bradyrrhoa gilveolella (Treitschke, 1832)
Bradyrrhoa trapezella (Duponchel, 1836)
Cadra furcatella (Herrich-Schäffer, 1849)
Catastia marginea (Denis & Schiffermüller, 1775)
Delplanqueia dilutella (Denis & Schiffermüller, 1775)
Dioryctria abietella (Denis & Schiffermüller, 1775)
Eccopisa effractella Zeller, 1848
Elegia fallax (Staudinger, 1881)
Elegia similella (Zincken, 1818)
Ematheudes punctella (Treitschke, 1833)
Endotricha flammealis (Denis & Schiffermüller, 1775)
Ephestia elutella (Hübner, 1796)
Ephestia unicolorella Staudinger, 1881
Epischnia cretaciella Mann, 1869
Epischnia illotella Zeller, 1839
Epischnia prodromella (Hübner, 1799)
Episcythrastis tabidella (Mann, 1864)
Episcythrastis tetricella (Denis & Schiffermüller, 1775)
Etiella zinckenella (Treitschke, 1832)
Eurhodope cirrigerella (Zincken, 1818)
Eurhodope incompta (Zeller, 1847)
Eurhodope rosella (Scopoli, 1763)
Euzophera bigella (Zeller, 1848)
Euzophera cinerosella (Zeller, 1839)
Euzophera fuliginosella (Heinemann, 1865)
Euzophera lunulella (O. Costa, 1836)
Euzophera pulchella Ragonot, 1887
Euzopherodes charlottae (Rebel, 1914)
Euzopherodes vapidella (Mann, 1857)
Galleria mellonella (Linnaeus, 1758)
Homoeosoma inustella Ragonot, 1884
Homoeosoma nebulella (Denis & Schiffermüller, 1775)
Homoeosoma nimbella (Duponchel, 1837)
Homoeosoma sinuella (Fabricius, 1794)
Hypochalcia ahenella (Denis & Schiffermüller, 1775)
Hypochalcia lignella (Hübner, 1796)
Hypochalcia orbipunctella Ragonot, 1887
Hypotia massilialis (Duponchel, 1832)
Hypsopygia costalis (Fabricius, 1775)
Hypsopygia fulvocilialis (Duponchel, 1834)
Hypsopygia glaucinalis (Linnaeus, 1758)
Hypsopygia rubidalis (Denis & Schiffermüller, 1775)
Hypsotropa limbella Zeller, 1848
Insalebria serraticornella (Zeller, 1839)
Isauria dilucidella (Duponchel, 1836)
Keradere lepidella (Ragonot, 1887)
Keradere tengstroemiella (Erschoff, 1874)
Khorassania compositella (Treitschke, 1835)
Lamoria anella (Denis & Schiffermüller, 1775)
Loryma egregialis (Herrich-Schäffer, 1838)
Matilella fusca (Haworth, 1811)
Megasis rippertella (Zeller, 1839)
Merulempista cingillella (Zeller, 1846)
Metallosticha argyrogrammos (Zeller, 1847)
Moitrelia obductella (Zeller, 1839)
Myelois circumvoluta (Fourcroy, 1785)
Nephopterix angustella (Hübner, 1796)
Nyctegretis lineana (Scopoli, 1786)
Oncocera semirubella (Scopoli, 1763)
Oxybia transversella (Duponchel, 1836)
Pempelia albariella Zeller, 1839
Pempelia alpigenella (Duponchel, 1836)
Pempelia amoenella (Zeller, 1848)
Pempelia brephiella (Staudinger, 1879)
Pempelia palumbella (Denis & Schiffermüller, 1775)
Pempeliella macedoniella (Ragonot, 1887)
Pempeliella ornatella (Denis & Schiffermüller, 1775)
Pempeliella sororculella (Ragonot, 1887)
Pempeliella sororiella Zeller, 1839
Phycita coronatella (Guenee, 1845)
Phycita meliella (Mann, 1864)
Phycita metzneri (Zeller, 1846)
Phycita pedisignella Ragonot, 1887
Phycita poteriella (Zeller, 1846)
Phycita roborella (Denis & Schiffermüller, 1775)
Phycitodes albatella (Ragonot, 1887)
Phycitodes binaevella (Hübner, 1813)
Phycitodes inquinatella (Ragonot, 1887)
Phycitodes lacteella (Rothschild, 1915)
Phycitodes saxicola (Vaughan, 1870)
Plodia interpunctella (Hübner, 1813)
Psorosa dahliella (Treitschke, 1832)
Psorosa mediterranella Amsel, 1953
Pterothrixidia rufella (Duponchel, 1836)
Pyralis farinalis (Linnaeus, 1758)
Pyralis regalis Denis & Schiffermüller, 1775
Raphimetopus ablutella (Zeller, 1839)
Rhodophaea formosa (Haworth, 1811)
Sciota imperialella (Ragonot, 1887)
Selagia argyrella (Denis & Schiffermüller, 1775)
Selagia spadicella (Hübner, 1796)
Selagia subochrella (Herrich-Schäffer, 1849)
Stemmatophora brunnealis (Treitschke, 1829)
Stemmatophora combustalis (Fischer v. Röslerstamm, 1842)
Stemmatophora honestalis (Treitschke, 1829)
Synaphe antennalis (Fabricius, 1794)
Synaphe moldavica (Esper, 1794)
Synaphe punctalis (Fabricius, 1775)
Trachonitis cristella (Denis & Schiffermüller, 1775)

Saturniidae
Aglia tau (Linnaeus, 1758)
Antheraea yamamai (Guerin-Meneville, 1861)
Saturnia pavoniella (Scopoli, 1763)
Saturnia spini (Denis & Schiffermüller, 1775)
Saturnia caecigena Kupido, 1825
Saturnia pyri (Denis & Schiffermüller, 1775)

Scythrididae
Enolmis desidella (Lederer, 1855)
Scythris aerariella (Herrich-Schäffer, 1855)
Scythris albidella (Stainton, 1867)
Scythris carboniella Jackh, 1978
Scythris confluens (Staudinger, 1870)
Scythris crassiuscula (Herrich-Schäffer, 1855)
Scythris cuspidella (Denis & Schiffermüller, 1775)
Scythris disparella (Tengstrom, 1848)
Scythris dissimilella (Herrich-Schäffer, 1855)
Scythris ericetella (Heinemann, 1872)
Scythris knochella (Fabricius, 1794)
Scythris laminella (Denis & Schiffermüller, 1775)
Scythris limbella (Fabricius, 1775)
Scythris pascuella (Zeller, 1855)
Scythris picaepennis (Haworth, 1828)
Scythris productella (Zeller, 1839)
Scythris punctivittella (O. Costa, 1836)
Scythris schleichiella (Zeller, 1870)
Scythris subseliniella (Heinemann, 1876)
Scythris tergestinella (Zeller, 1855)
Scythris tributella (Zeller, 1847)
Scythris vittella (O. Costa, 1834)

Sesiidae
Bembecia albanensis (Rebel, 1918)
Bembecia ichneumoniformis (Denis & Schiffermüller, 1775)
Bembecia megillaeformis (Hübner, 1813)
Bembecia pavicevici Tosevski, 1989
Bembecia scopigera (Scopoli, 1763)
Bembecia uroceriformis (Treitschke, 1834)
Chamaesphecia alysoniformis (Herrich-Schäffer, 1846)
Chamaesphecia annellata (Zeller, 1847)
Chamaesphecia astatiformis (Herrich-Schäffer, 1846)
Chamaesphecia bibioniformis (Esper, 1800)
Chamaesphecia chalciformis (Esper, 1804)
Chamaesphecia doleriformis (Herrich-Schäffer, 1846)
Chamaesphecia dumonti Le Cerf, 1922
Chamaesphecia empiformis (Esper, 1783)
Chamaesphecia euceraeformis (Ochsenheimer, 1816)
Chamaesphecia leucopsiformis (Esper, 1800)
Chamaesphecia masariformis (Ochsenheimer, 1808)
Chamaesphecia nigrifrons (Le Cerf, 1911)
Chamaesphecia proximata (Staudinger, 1891)
Chamaesphecia schmidtiiformis (Freyer, 1836)
Chamaesphecia tenthrediniformis (Denis & Schiffermüller, 1775)
Chamaesphecia thracica Z. Lastuvka, 1983
Paranthrene diaphana Dalla Torre & Strand, 1925
Paranthrene insolitus Le Cerf, 1914
Paranthrene tabaniformis (Rottemburg, 1775)
Pennisetia hylaeiformis (Laspeyres, 1801)
Pyropteron affinis (Staudinger, 1856)
Pyropteron leucomelaena (Zeller, 1847)
Pyropteron minianiformis (Freyer, 1843)
Pyropteron muscaeformis (Esper, 1783)
Pyropteron triannuliformis (Freyer, 1843)
Sesia apiformis (Clerck, 1759)
Sesia pimplaeformis Oberthur, 1872
Synanthedon andrenaeformis (Laspeyres, 1801)
Synanthedon cephiformis (Ochsenheimer, 1808)
Synanthedon conopiformis (Esper, 1782)
Synanthedon culiciformis (Linnaeus, 1758)
Synanthedon formicaeformis (Esper, 1783)
Synanthedon loranthi (Kralicek, 1966)
Synanthedon mesiaeformis (Herrich-Schäffer, 1846)
Synanthedon myopaeformis (Borkhausen, 1789)
Synanthedon spheciformis (Denis & Schiffermüller, 1775)
Synanthedon spuleri (Fuchs, 1908)
Synanthedon stomoxiformis (Hübner, 1790)
Synanthedon tipuliformis (Clerck, 1759)
Synanthedon vespiformis (Linnaeus, 1761)
Tinthia brosiformis (Hübner, 1813)
Tinthia myrmosaeformis (Herrich-Schäffer, 1846)
Tinthia tineiformis (Esper, 1789)

Sphingidae
Acherontia atropos (Linnaeus, 1758)
Agrius convolvuli (Linnaeus, 1758)
Daphnis nerii (Linnaeus, 1758)
Deilephila elpenor (Linnaeus, 1758)
Deilephila porcellus (Linnaeus, 1758)
Hemaris croatica (Esper, 1800)
Hemaris fuciformis (Linnaeus, 1758)
Hemaris tityus (Linnaeus, 1758)
Hyles euphorbiae (Linnaeus, 1758)
Hyles livornica (Esper, 1780)
Laothoe populi (Linnaeus, 1758)
Macroglossum stellatarum (Linnaeus, 1758)
Marumba quercus (Denis & Schiffermüller, 1775)
Mimas tiliae (Linnaeus, 1758)
Proserpinus proserpina (Pallas, 1772)
Smerinthus ocellata (Linnaeus, 1758)
Sphingoneopsis gorgoniades (Hübner, 1819)
Sphinx ligustri Linnaeus, 1758
Theretra alecto (Linnaeus, 1758)

Tineidae
Ateliotum hungaricellum Zeller, 1839
Cephimallota angusticostella (Zeller, 1839)
Cephimallota crassiflavella Bruand, 1851
Eudarcia forsteri (Petersen, 1964)
Eudarcia granulatella (Zeller, 1852)
Eudarcia kasyi (Petersen, 1971)
Euplocamus anthracinalis (Scopoli, 1763)
Euplocamus ophisus (Cramer, 1779)
Hapsifera luridella Zeller, 1847
Infurcitinea albanica Petersen, 1963
Infurcitinea albicomella (Stainton, 1851)
Infurcitinea banatica Petersen, 1961
Infurcitinea kasyi Petersen, 1962
Infurcitinea lakoniae Gaedike, 1983
Infurcitinea ochridella Petersen, 1962
Infurcitinea rumelicella (Rebel, 1903)
Lichenotinea pustulatella (Zeller, 1852)
Monopis crocicapitella (Clemens, 1859)
Monopis imella (Hübner, 1813)
Monopis laevigella (Denis & Schiffermüller, 1775)
Monopis obviella (Denis & Schiffermüller, 1775)
Morophaga choragella (Denis & Schiffermüller, 1775)
Myrmecozela parnassiella (Rebel, 1915)
Nemapogon clematella (Fabricius, 1781)
Nemapogon granella (Linnaeus, 1758)
Nemapogon gravosaellus Petersen, 1957
Nemapogon hungaricus Gozmany, 1960
Nemapogon inconditella (Lucas, 1956)
Nemapogon signatellus Petersen, 1957
Neurothaumasia ankerella (Mann, 1867)
Neurothaumasia macedonica Petersen, 1962
Niditinea striolella (Matsumura, 1931)
Reisserita relicinella (Herrich-Schäffer, 1853)
Stenoptinea cyaneimarmorella (Milliere, 1854)
Tinea basifasciella Ragonot, 1895
Tinea flavescentella Haworth, 1828
Tinea pellionella Linnaeus, 1758
Tinea trinotella Thunberg, 1794
Triaxomasia caprimulgella (Stainton, 1851)
Trichophaga bipartitella (Ragonot, 1892)

Tischeriidae
Coptotriche angusticollella (Duponchel, 1843)
Coptotriche marginea (Haworth, 1828)
Tischeria decidua Wocke, 1876
Tischeria ekebladella (Bjerkander, 1795)

Tortricidae
Acleris bergmanniana (Linnaeus, 1758)
Acleris boscanoides Razowski, 1959
Acleris forsskaleana (Linnaeus, 1758)
Acleris hastiana (Linnaeus, 1758)
Acleris holmiana (Linnaeus, 1758)
Acleris literana (Linnaeus, 1758)
Acleris permutana (Duponchel, 1836)
Acleris quercinana (Zeller, 1849)
Acleris rhombana (Denis & Schiffermüller, 1775)
Acleris schalleriana (Linnaeus, 1761)
Acleris sparsana (Denis & Schiffermüller, 1775)
Acleris variegana (Denis & Schiffermüller, 1775)
Aethes bilbaensis (Rossler, 1877)
Aethes flagellana (Duponchel, 1836)
Aethes francillana (Fabricius, 1794)
Aethes hartmanniana (Clerck, 1759)
Aethes kasyi Razowski, 1962
Aethes margaritana (Haworth, 1811)
Aethes margarotana (Duponchel, 1836)
Aethes moribundana (Staudinger, 1859)
Aethes nefandana (Kennel, 1899)
Aethes rutilana (Hübner, 1817)
Aethes sanguinana (Treitschke, 1830)
Aethes smeathmanniana (Fabricius, 1781)
Aethes tesserana (Denis & Schiffermüller, 1775)
Aethes tornella (Walsingham, 1898)
Agapeta hamana (Linnaeus, 1758)
Agapeta zoegana (Linnaeus, 1767)
Aleimma loeflingiana (Linnaeus, 1758)
Ancylis achatana (Denis & Schiffermüller, 1775)
Ancylis apicella (Denis & Schiffermüller, 1775)
Ancylis comptana (Frolich, 1828)
Ancylis mitterbacheriana (Denis & Schiffermüller, 1775)
Ancylis selenana (Guenee, 1845)
Ancylis tineana (Hübner, 1799)
Aphelia viburniana (Denis & Schiffermüller, 1775)
Aphelia euxina (Djakonov, 1929)
Aphelia ferugana (Hübner, 1793)
Apotomis capreana (Hübner, 1817)
Archips podana (Scopoli, 1763)
Archips rosana (Linnaeus, 1758)
Archips xylosteana (Linnaeus, 1758)
Argyroploce arbutella (Linnaeus, 1758)
Avaria hyerana (Milliere, 1858)
Bactra furfurana (Haworth, 1811)
Bactra lancealana (Hübner, 1799)
Celypha lacunana (Denis & Schiffermüller, 1775)
Celypha rurestrana (Duponchel, 1843)
Celypha striana (Denis & Schiffermüller, 1775)
Choristoneura hebenstreitella (Muller, 1764)
Clepsis balcanica (Rebel, 1917)
Clepsis burgasiensis (Rebel, 1916)
Clepsis consimilana (Hübner, 1817)
Clepsis pallidana (Fabricius, 1776)
Clepsis rurinana (Linnaeus, 1758)
Clepsis senecionana (Hübner, 1819)
Cnephasia alticolana (Herrich-Schäffer, 1851)
Cnephasia asseclana (Denis & Schiffermüller, 1775)
Cnephasia communana (Herrich-Schäffer, 1851)
Cnephasia cupressivorana (Staudinger, 1871)
Cnephasia graecana Rebel, 1902
Cnephasia heringi Razowski, 1958
Cnephasia klimeschi Razowski, 1956
Cnephasia stephensiana (Doubleday, 1849)
Cnephasia abrasana (Duponchel, 1843)
Cnephasia incertana (Treitschke, 1835)
Cochylidia implicitana (Wocke, 1856)
Cochylidia subroseana (Haworth, 1811)
Cochylimorpha jucundana (Treitschke, 1835)
Cochylimorpha meridiana (Staudinger, 1859)
Cochylimorpha straminea (Haworth, 1811)
Cochylis dubitana (Hübner, 1799)
Cochylis epilinana Duponchel, 1842
Cochylis pallidana Zeller, 1847
Cochylis posterana Zeller, 1847
Cochylis roseana (Haworth, 1811)
Cochylis salebrana (Mann, 1862)
Crocidosema plebejana Zeller, 1847
Cryptocochylis conjunctana (Mann, 1864)
Cydia amplana (Hübner, 1800)
Cydia duplicana (Zetterstedt, 1839)
Cydia fagiglandana (Zeller, 1841)
Cydia inquinatana (Hübner, 1800)
Cydia pactolana (Zeller, 1840)
Cydia pomonella (Linnaeus, 1758)
Cydia pyrivora (Danilevsky, 1947)
Cydia splendana (Hübner, 1799)
Cydia succedana (Denis & Schiffermüller, 1775)
Cydia ulicetana (Haworth, 1811)
Diceratura ostrinana (Guenee, 1845)
Diceratura rhodograpta Djakonov, 1929
Diceratura roseofasciana (Mann, 1855)
Dichelia histrionana (Frolich, 1828)
Dichrorampha cinerosana (Herrich-Schäffer, 1851)
Dichrorampha coniana Obraztsov, 1953
Dichrorampha gruneriana (Herrich-Schäffer, 1851)
Dichrorampha petiverella (Linnaeus, 1758)
Dichrorampha plumbagana (Treitschke, 1830)
Dichrorampha plumbana (Scopoli, 1763)
Doloploca punctulana (Denis & Schiffermüller, 1775)
Eana derivana (de La Harpe, 1858)
Eana incanana (Stephens, 1852)
Eana italica (Obraztsov, 1950)
Eana penziana (Thunberg, 1791)
Eana argentana (Clerck, 1759)
Eana osseana (Scopoli, 1763)
Eana canescana (Guenee, 1845)
Enarmonia formosana (Scopoli, 1763)
Endothenia marginana (Haworth, 1811)
Endothenia nigricostana (Haworth, 1811)
Epagoge grotiana (Fabricius, 1781)
Epiblema costipunctana (Haworth, 1811)
Epiblema gammana (Mann, 1866)
Epiblema graphana (Treitschke, 1835)
Epiblema hepaticana (Treitschke, 1835)
Epiblema inulivora (Meyrick, 1932)
Epiblema scutulana (Denis & Schiffermüller, 1775)
Epiblema sticticana (Fabricius, 1794)
Epiblema turbidana (Treitschke, 1835)
Epinotia abbreviana (Fabricius, 1794)
Epinotia dalmatana (Rebel, 1891)
Epinotia festivana (Hübner, 1799)
Epinotia kochiana (Herrich-Schäffer, 1851)
Epinotia thapsiana (Zeller, 1847)
Eucosma albidulana (Herrich-Schäffer, 1851)
Eucosma campoliliana (Denis & Schiffermüller, 1775)
Eucosma cana (Haworth, 1811)
Eucosma conformana (Mann, 1872)
Eucosma conterminana (Guenee, 1845)
Eucosma lugubrana (Treitschke, 1830)
Eudemis profundana (Denis & Schiffermüller, 1775)
Eugnosta lathoniana (Hübner, 1800)
Eugnosta magnificana (Rebel, 1914)
Eupoecilia ambiguella (Hübner, 1796)
Eupoecilia angustana (Hübner, 1799)
Eupoecilia cebrana (Hübner, 1813)
Falseuncaria ruficiliana (Haworth, 1811)
Grapholita funebrana Treitschke, 1835
Grapholita molesta (Busck, 1916)
Grapholita lunulana (Denis & Schiffermüller, 1775)
Grapholita nebritana Treitschke, 1830
Gypsonoma aceriana (Duponchel, 1843)
Gypsonoma dealbana (Frolich, 1828)
Gypsonoma minutana (Hübner, 1799)
Hedya nubiferana (Haworth, 1811)
Hedya ochroleucana (Frolich, 1828)
Hedya pruniana (Hübner, 1799)
Hysterophora maculosana (Haworth, 1811)
Isotrias hybridana (Hübner, 1817)
Lathronympha strigana (Fabricius, 1775)
Lobesia bicinctana (Duponchel, 1844)
Lobesia botrana (Denis & Schiffermüller, 1775)
Lobesia indusiana (Zeller, 1847)
Metendothenia atropunctana (Zetterstedt, 1839)
Neosphaleroptera nubilana (Hübner, 1799)
Notocelia cynosbatella (Linnaeus, 1758)
Notocelia incarnatana (Hübner, 1800)
Notocelia roborana (Denis & Schiffermüller, 1775)
Notocelia trimaculana (Haworth, 1811)
Notocelia uddmanniana (Linnaeus, 1758)
Olethreutes arcuella (Clerck, 1759)
Orthotaenia undulana (Denis & Schiffermüller, 1775)
Pammene blockiana (Herrich-Schäffer, 1851)
Pammene christophana (Moschler, 1862)
Pammene fasciana (Linnaeus, 1761)
Pammene mariana (Zerny, 1920)
Pammene percognata Diakonoff, 1976
Pammene rhediella (Clerck, 1759)
Pammene splendidulana (Guenee, 1845)
Pandemis cerasana (Hübner, 1786)
Pandemis heparana (Denis & Schiffermüller, 1775)
Paramesia gnomana (Clerck, 1759)
Pelochrista mollitana (Zeller, 1847)
Periclepsis cinctana (Denis & Schiffermüller, 1775)
Phalonidia contractana (Zeller, 1847)
Phalonidia manniana (Fischer v. Röslerstamm, 1839)
Phaneta pauperana (Duponchel, 1843)
Phiaris stibiana (Guenee, 1845)
Phtheochroa duponchelana (Duponchel, 1843)
Phtheochroa pulvillana Herrich-Schäffer, 1851
Phtheochroa sodaliana (Haworth, 1811)
Prochlidonia amiantana (Hübner, 1799)
Propiromorpha rhodophana (Herrich-Schäffer, 1851)
Pseudargyrotoza conwagana (Fabricius, 1775)
Pseudeulia asinana (Hübner, 1799)
Ptycholoma lecheana (Linnaeus, 1758)
Ptycholomoides aeriferana (Herrich-Schäffer, 1851)
Rhopobota myrtillana (Humphreys & Westwood, 1845)
Rhyacionia duplana (Hübner, 1813)
Sparganothis pilleriana (Denis & Schiffermüller, 1775)
Spilonota ocellana (Denis & Schiffermüller, 1775)
Strophedra weirana (Douglas, 1850)
Thiodia citrana (Hübner, 1799)
Thiodia major (Rebel, 1903)
Thiodia trochilana (Frolich, 1828)
Tortricodes alternella (Denis & Schiffermüller, 1775)
Tortrix viridana Linnaeus, 1758
Xerocnephasia rigana (Sodoffsky, 1829)
Zeiraphera isertana (Fabricius, 1794)

Yponomeutidae
Kessleria saxifragae (Stainton, 1868)
Kessleria alpicella (Stainton, 1851)
Kessleria macedonica Huemer & Tarmann, 1992
Pseudoswammerdamia combinella (Hübner, 1786)
Scythropia crataegella (Linnaeus, 1767)
Swammerdamia pyrella (Villers, 1789)
Yponomeuta padella (Linnaeus, 1758)
Yponomeuta plumbella (Denis & Schiffermüller, 1775)
Yponomeuta sedella Treitschke, 1832
Zelleria hepariella Stainton, 1849

Ypsolophidae
Ypsolopha albiramella (Mann, 1861)
Ypsolopha instabilella (Mann, 1866)
Ypsolopha lucella (Fabricius, 1775)
Ypsolopha parenthesella (Linnaeus, 1761)
Ypsolopha persicella (Fabricius, 1787)
Ypsolopha scabrella (Linnaeus, 1761)
Ypsolopha semitessella (Mann, 1861)
Ypsolopha ustella (Clerck, 1759)

Zygaenidae
Adscita albanica (Naufock, 1926)
Adscita geryon (Hübner, 1813)
Adscita obscura (Zeller, 1847)
Adscita statices (Linnaeus, 1758)
Adscita mannii (Lederer, 1853)
Jordanita chloros (Hübner, 1813)
Jordanita globulariae (Hübner, 1793)
Jordanita graeca (Jordan, 1907)
Jordanita subsolana (Staudinger, 1862)
Jordanita budensis (Ad. & Au. Speyer, 1858)
Jordanita notata (Zeller, 1847)
Rhagades pruni (Denis & Schiffermüller, 1775)
Theresimima ampellophaga (Bayle-Barelle, 1808)
Zygaena carniolica (Scopoli, 1763)
Zygaena brizae (Esper, 1800)
Zygaena laeta (Hübner, 1790)
Zygaena minos (Denis & Schiffermüller, 1775)
Zygaena punctum Ochsenheimer, 1808
Zygaena purpuralis (Brunnich, 1763)
Zygaena angelicae Ochsenheimer, 1808
Zygaena ephialtes (Linnaeus, 1767)
Zygaena exulans (Hohenwarth, 1792)
Zygaena filipendulae (Linnaeus, 1758)
Zygaena lonicerae (Scheven, 1777)
Zygaena loti (Denis & Schiffermüller, 1775)
Zygaena nevadensis Rambur, 1858
Zygaena osterodensis Reiss, 1921
Zygaena viciae (Denis & Schiffermüller, 1775)

External links
Fauna Europaea

North Macedonia
North Macedonia
 North Macedonia
Lepidoptera
Fauna of North Macedonia